

363001–363100 

|-bgcolor=#E9E9E9
| 363001 ||  || — || August 27, 2006 || Kitt Peak || Spacewatch || AGN || align=right | 1.4 km || 
|-id=002 bgcolor=#d6d6d6
| 363002 ||  || — || June 22, 1998 || Kitt Peak || Spacewatch || — || align=right | 4.5 km || 
|-id=003 bgcolor=#E9E9E9
| 363003 ||  || — || November 9, 2007 || Kitt Peak || Spacewatch || HEN || align=right | 1.3 km || 
|-id=004 bgcolor=#E9E9E9
| 363004 ||  || — || April 12, 2005 || Kitt Peak || Spacewatch || — || align=right data-sort-value="0.89" | 890 m || 
|-id=005 bgcolor=#d6d6d6
| 363005 ||  || — || October 25, 2005 || Catalina || CSS || — || align=right | 4.8 km || 
|-id=006 bgcolor=#E9E9E9
| 363006 ||  || — || March 28, 2009 || Kitt Peak || Spacewatch || — || align=right | 1.6 km || 
|-id=007 bgcolor=#E9E9E9
| 363007 ||  || — || January 29, 2004 || Anderson Mesa || LONEOS || — || align=right | 3.5 km || 
|-id=008 bgcolor=#E9E9E9
| 363008 ||  || — || March 3, 2000 || Socorro || LINEAR || — || align=right | 2.1 km || 
|-id=009 bgcolor=#E9E9E9
| 363009 ||  || — || March 20, 1999 || Apache Point || SDSS || DOR || align=right | 2.8 km || 
|-id=010 bgcolor=#d6d6d6
| 363010 ||  || — || September 24, 1960 || Palomar || L. D. Schmadel, R. M. Stoss || — || align=right | 2.9 km || 
|-id=011 bgcolor=#E9E9E9
| 363011 ||  || — || March 2, 1981 || Siding Spring || S. J. Bus || — || align=right | 2.3 km || 
|-id=012 bgcolor=#FA8072
| 363012 ||  || — || August 14, 1988 || Palomar || C. S. Shoemaker || — || align=right | 1.4 km || 
|-id=013 bgcolor=#E9E9E9
| 363013 ||  || — || October 9, 1993 || La Silla || E. W. Elst || — || align=right | 1.5 km || 
|-id=014 bgcolor=#d6d6d6
| 363014 ||  || — || November 9, 1993 || Kitt Peak || Spacewatch || — || align=right | 4.3 km || 
|-id=015 bgcolor=#fefefe
| 363015 ||  || — || September 24, 1995 || Kitt Peak || Spacewatch || — || align=right data-sort-value="0.86" | 860 m || 
|-id=016 bgcolor=#fefefe
| 363016 ||  || — || October 15, 1995 || Kitt Peak || Spacewatch || — || align=right data-sort-value="0.56" | 560 m || 
|-id=017 bgcolor=#fefefe
| 363017 ||  || — || November 15, 1995 || Kitt Peak || Spacewatch || — || align=right | 1.0 km || 
|-id=018 bgcolor=#fefefe
| 363018 ||  || — || October 3, 1996 || Xinglong || SCAP || — || align=right data-sort-value="0.98" | 980 m || 
|-id=019 bgcolor=#FA8072
| 363019 ||  || — || October 12, 1996 || Haleakala || NEAT || — || align=right | 1.6 km || 
|-id=020 bgcolor=#E9E9E9
| 363020 ||  || — || January 9, 1997 || Kitt Peak || Spacewatch || DOR || align=right | 3.0 km || 
|-id=021 bgcolor=#fefefe
| 363021 ||  || — || March 3, 1997 || Kitt Peak || Spacewatch || — || align=right | 1.0 km || 
|-id=022 bgcolor=#d6d6d6
| 363022 ||  || — || March 2, 1997 || Kitt Peak || Spacewatch || — || align=right | 3.4 km || 
|-id=023 bgcolor=#d6d6d6
| 363023 ||  || — || September 1, 1997 || Caussols || ODAS || THB || align=right | 4.1 km || 
|-id=024 bgcolor=#FFC2E0
| 363024 ||  || — || July 21, 1998 || Socorro || LINEAR || APOPHA || align=right data-sort-value="0.56" | 560 m || 
|-id=025 bgcolor=#d6d6d6
| 363025 ||  || — || September 18, 1998 || Caussols || ODAS || — || align=right | 3.6 km || 
|-id=026 bgcolor=#d6d6d6
| 363026 ||  || — || September 19, 1998 || Kitt Peak || Spacewatch || — || align=right | 2.6 km || 
|-id=027 bgcolor=#FFC2E0
| 363027 ||  || — || September 24, 1998 || Socorro || LINEAR || ATEPHAmoon || align=right data-sort-value="0.58" | 580 m || 
|-id=028 bgcolor=#fefefe
| 363028 ||  || — || October 14, 1998 || Kitt Peak || Spacewatch || — || align=right data-sort-value="0.65" | 650 m || 
|-id=029 bgcolor=#d6d6d6
| 363029 ||  || — || October 18, 1998 || La Silla || E. W. Elst || — || align=right | 4.7 km || 
|-id=030 bgcolor=#fefefe
| 363030 ||  || — || November 14, 1998 || Kitt Peak || Spacewatch || — || align=right data-sort-value="0.62" | 620 m || 
|-id=031 bgcolor=#d6d6d6
| 363031 ||  || — || December 15, 1998 || Caussols || ODAS || — || align=right | 5.8 km || 
|-id=032 bgcolor=#fefefe
| 363032 ||  || — || March 20, 1999 || Apache Point || SDSS || V || align=right data-sort-value="0.63" | 630 m || 
|-id=033 bgcolor=#fefefe
| 363033 ||  || — || August 30, 1999 || Gnosca || S. Sposetti || — || align=right data-sort-value="0.95" | 950 m || 
|-id=034 bgcolor=#fefefe
| 363034 ||  || — || September 7, 1999 || Socorro || LINEAR || MAS || align=right data-sort-value="0.97" | 970 m || 
|-id=035 bgcolor=#fefefe
| 363035 ||  || — || September 9, 1999 || Socorro || LINEAR || — || align=right | 1.0 km || 
|-id=036 bgcolor=#fefefe
| 363036 ||  || — || September 7, 1999 || Socorro || LINEAR || NYS || align=right data-sort-value="0.78" | 780 m || 
|-id=037 bgcolor=#fefefe
| 363037 ||  || — || September 8, 1999 || Socorro || LINEAR || — || align=right | 1.4 km || 
|-id=038 bgcolor=#d6d6d6
| 363038 ||  || — || October 3, 1999 || Catalina || CSS || — || align=right | 3.6 km || 
|-id=039 bgcolor=#fefefe
| 363039 ||  || — || October 4, 1999 || Kitt Peak || Spacewatch || — || align=right | 1.1 km || 
|-id=040 bgcolor=#fefefe
| 363040 ||  || — || October 4, 1999 || Socorro || LINEAR || NYS || align=right data-sort-value="0.76" | 760 m || 
|-id=041 bgcolor=#fefefe
| 363041 ||  || — || October 10, 1999 || Socorro || LINEAR || — || align=right | 1.3 km || 
|-id=042 bgcolor=#d6d6d6
| 363042 ||  || — || October 12, 1999 || Socorro || LINEAR || — || align=right | 4.4 km || 
|-id=043 bgcolor=#fefefe
| 363043 ||  || — || October 9, 1999 || Socorro || LINEAR || — || align=right data-sort-value="0.92" | 920 m || 
|-id=044 bgcolor=#E9E9E9
| 363044 ||  || — || October 7, 1999 || Catalina || CSS || CLO || align=right | 2.5 km || 
|-id=045 bgcolor=#fefefe
| 363045 ||  || — || October 6, 1999 || Socorro || LINEAR || V || align=right data-sort-value="0.68" | 680 m || 
|-id=046 bgcolor=#d6d6d6
| 363046 ||  || — || October 6, 1999 || Socorro || LINEAR || LIX || align=right | 3.8 km || 
|-id=047 bgcolor=#d6d6d6
| 363047 ||  || — || October 13, 1999 || Socorro || LINEAR || EOS || align=right | 1.8 km || 
|-id=048 bgcolor=#fefefe
| 363048 ||  || — || September 14, 1999 || Socorro || LINEAR || NYS || align=right data-sort-value="0.76" | 760 m || 
|-id=049 bgcolor=#d6d6d6
| 363049 ||  || — || November 3, 1999 || Socorro || LINEAR || — || align=right | 4.7 km || 
|-id=050 bgcolor=#d6d6d6
| 363050 ||  || — || November 5, 1999 || Kitt Peak || Spacewatch || — || align=right | 3.7 km || 
|-id=051 bgcolor=#d6d6d6
| 363051 ||  || — || November 5, 1999 || Kitt Peak || Spacewatch || — || align=right | 2.5 km || 
|-id=052 bgcolor=#d6d6d6
| 363052 ||  || — || November 5, 1999 || Socorro || LINEAR || — || align=right | 2.8 km || 
|-id=053 bgcolor=#d6d6d6
| 363053 ||  || — || November 9, 1999 || Socorro || LINEAR || — || align=right | 3.4 km || 
|-id=054 bgcolor=#fefefe
| 363054 ||  || — || November 9, 1999 || Socorro || LINEAR || — || align=right | 1.1 km || 
|-id=055 bgcolor=#fefefe
| 363055 ||  || — || November 9, 1999 || Socorro || LINEAR || — || align=right | 1.1 km || 
|-id=056 bgcolor=#d6d6d6
| 363056 ||  || — || November 9, 1999 || Kitt Peak || Spacewatch || — || align=right | 3.5 km || 
|-id=057 bgcolor=#d6d6d6
| 363057 ||  || — || November 10, 1999 || Kitt Peak || Spacewatch || LIX || align=right | 3.7 km || 
|-id=058 bgcolor=#d6d6d6
| 363058 ||  || — || November 9, 1999 || Kitt Peak || Spacewatch || — || align=right | 4.0 km || 
|-id=059 bgcolor=#d6d6d6
| 363059 ||  || — || November 12, 1999 || Socorro || LINEAR || — || align=right | 3.5 km || 
|-id=060 bgcolor=#d6d6d6
| 363060 ||  || — || November 11, 1999 || Kitt Peak || Spacewatch || — || align=right | 2.9 km || 
|-id=061 bgcolor=#E9E9E9
| 363061 ||  || — || December 15, 1999 || Socorro || LINEAR || — || align=right | 1.6 km || 
|-id=062 bgcolor=#d6d6d6
| 363062 ||  || — || December 7, 1999 || Socorro || LINEAR || — || align=right | 4.6 km || 
|-id=063 bgcolor=#E9E9E9
| 363063 ||  || — || January 5, 2000 || Socorro || LINEAR || — || align=right | 1.6 km || 
|-id=064 bgcolor=#E9E9E9
| 363064 ||  || — || January 28, 2000 || Kitt Peak || Spacewatch || — || align=right | 1.2 km || 
|-id=065 bgcolor=#E9E9E9
| 363065 ||  || — || January 28, 2000 || Kitt Peak || Spacewatch || — || align=right data-sort-value="0.95" | 950 m || 
|-id=066 bgcolor=#E9E9E9
| 363066 ||  || — || February 7, 2000 || Kitt Peak || Spacewatch || — || align=right | 1.0 km || 
|-id=067 bgcolor=#FFC2E0
| 363067 ||  || — || February 8, 2000 || Socorro || LINEAR || APOPHAmooncritical || align=right data-sort-value="0.54" | 540 m || 
|-id=068 bgcolor=#E9E9E9
| 363068 ||  || — || February 27, 2000 || Kitt Peak || Spacewatch || — || align=right data-sort-value="0.98" | 980 m || 
|-id=069 bgcolor=#FFC2E0
| 363069 ||  || — || March 11, 2000 || Socorro || LINEAR || AMO || align=right data-sort-value="0.47" | 470 m || 
|-id=070 bgcolor=#fefefe
| 363070 ||  || — || April 2, 2000 || Kitt Peak || Spacewatch || — || align=right data-sort-value="0.89" | 890 m || 
|-id=071 bgcolor=#FFC2E0
| 363071 ||  || — || April 3, 2000 || Mauna Kea || D. J. Tholen, R. J. Whiteley || APOcritical || align=right data-sort-value="0.31" | 310 m || 
|-id=072 bgcolor=#E9E9E9
| 363072 ||  || — || April 5, 2000 || Socorro || LINEAR || — || align=right | 1.9 km || 
|-id=073 bgcolor=#E9E9E9
| 363073 ||  || — || June 9, 2000 || Haleakala || NEAT || — || align=right | 2.1 km || 
|-id=074 bgcolor=#fefefe
| 363074 ||  || — || July 5, 2000 || Anderson Mesa || LONEOS || PHO || align=right | 1.4 km || 
|-id=075 bgcolor=#FFC2E0
| 363075 ||  || — || July 29, 2000 || Anderson Mesa || LONEOS || AMO +1km || align=right | 1.0 km || 
|-id=076 bgcolor=#FFC2E0
| 363076 ||  || — || August 3, 2000 || Socorro || LINEAR || AMO +1km || align=right data-sort-value="0.98" | 980 m || 
|-id=077 bgcolor=#fefefe
| 363077 || 2000 QK || — || August 21, 2000 || Prescott || P. G. Comba || — || align=right data-sort-value="0.78" | 780 m || 
|-id=078 bgcolor=#fefefe
| 363078 ||  || — || August 31, 2000 || Socorro || LINEAR || FLO || align=right data-sort-value="0.84" | 840 m || 
|-id=079 bgcolor=#fefefe
| 363079 ||  || — || August 31, 2000 || Socorro || LINEAR || FLO || align=right data-sort-value="0.56" | 560 m || 
|-id=080 bgcolor=#FA8072
| 363080 ||  || — || August 29, 2000 || Socorro || LINEAR || — || align=right | 2.3 km || 
|-id=081 bgcolor=#E9E9E9
| 363081 ||  || — || August 31, 2000 || Socorro || LINEAR || — || align=right | 1.5 km || 
|-id=082 bgcolor=#E9E9E9
| 363082 ||  || — || August 31, 2000 || Socorro || LINEAR || — || align=right | 2.0 km || 
|-id=083 bgcolor=#E9E9E9
| 363083 ||  || — || September 1, 2000 || Socorro || LINEAR || — || align=right | 2.3 km || 
|-id=084 bgcolor=#FFC2E0
| 363084 ||  || — || September 6, 2000 || Socorro || LINEAR || AMOPHA || align=right data-sort-value="0.37" | 370 m || 
|-id=085 bgcolor=#fefefe
| 363085 ||  || — || September 7, 2000 || Kitt Peak || Spacewatch || — || align=right data-sort-value="0.76" | 760 m || 
|-id=086 bgcolor=#fefefe
| 363086 ||  || — || September 1, 2000 || Socorro || LINEAR || V || align=right data-sort-value="0.79" | 790 m || 
|-id=087 bgcolor=#E9E9E9
| 363087 ||  || — || September 5, 2000 || Anderson Mesa || LONEOS || — || align=right | 2.9 km || 
|-id=088 bgcolor=#FA8072
| 363088 ||  || — || September 23, 2000 || Socorro || LINEAR || — || align=right data-sort-value="0.77" | 770 m || 
|-id=089 bgcolor=#E9E9E9
| 363089 ||  || — || September 23, 2000 || Socorro || LINEAR || — || align=right | 2.6 km || 
|-id=090 bgcolor=#fefefe
| 363090 ||  || — || September 23, 2000 || Socorro || LINEAR || — || align=right data-sort-value="0.93" | 930 m || 
|-id=091 bgcolor=#FA8072
| 363091 ||  || — || September 24, 2000 || Socorro || LINEAR || — || align=right data-sort-value="0.71" | 710 m || 
|-id=092 bgcolor=#E9E9E9
| 363092 ||  || — || September 24, 2000 || Socorro || LINEAR || — || align=right | 2.3 km || 
|-id=093 bgcolor=#E9E9E9
| 363093 ||  || — || September 22, 2000 || Socorro || LINEAR || — || align=right | 4.1 km || 
|-id=094 bgcolor=#E9E9E9
| 363094 ||  || — || September 28, 2000 || Socorro || LINEAR || — || align=right | 2.6 km || 
|-id=095 bgcolor=#E9E9E9
| 363095 ||  || — || September 21, 2000 || Haleakala || NEAT || — || align=right | 2.9 km || 
|-id=096 bgcolor=#fefefe
| 363096 ||  || — || September 28, 2000 || Socorro || LINEAR || — || align=right | 1.2 km || 
|-id=097 bgcolor=#fefefe
| 363097 ||  || — || September 30, 2000 || Socorro || LINEAR || — || align=right | 1.0 km || 
|-id=098 bgcolor=#E9E9E9
| 363098 ||  || — || September 30, 2000 || Socorro || LINEAR || — || align=right | 2.4 km || 
|-id=099 bgcolor=#d6d6d6
| 363099 ||  || — || September 21, 2000 || Kitt Peak || M. W. Buie || KOR || align=right | 1.2 km || 
|-id=100 bgcolor=#E9E9E9
| 363100 ||  || — || September 26, 2000 || Socorro || LINEAR || — || align=right | 2.7 km || 
|}

363101–363200 

|-bgcolor=#E9E9E9
| 363101 ||  || — || September 21, 2000 || Anderson Mesa || LONEOS || — || align=right | 2.2 km || 
|-id=102 bgcolor=#fefefe
| 363102 ||  || — || October 1, 2000 || Socorro || LINEAR || V || align=right data-sort-value="0.68" | 680 m || 
|-id=103 bgcolor=#fefefe
| 363103 ||  || — || October 1, 2000 || Socorro || LINEAR || — || align=right | 1.1 km || 
|-id=104 bgcolor=#fefefe
| 363104 ||  || — || October 1, 2000 || Socorro || LINEAR || V || align=right data-sort-value="0.69" | 690 m || 
|-id=105 bgcolor=#fefefe
| 363105 ||  || — || October 24, 2000 || Socorro || LINEAR || — || align=right | 1.1 km || 
|-id=106 bgcolor=#E9E9E9
| 363106 ||  || — || October 24, 2000 || Socorro || LINEAR || — || align=right | 2.7 km || 
|-id=107 bgcolor=#fefefe
| 363107 ||  || — || October 25, 2000 || Socorro || LINEAR || V || align=right data-sort-value="0.73" | 730 m || 
|-id=108 bgcolor=#d6d6d6
| 363108 ||  || — || November 20, 2000 || Socorro || LINEAR || — || align=right | 4.5 km || 
|-id=109 bgcolor=#fefefe
| 363109 ||  || — || November 20, 2000 || Socorro || LINEAR || H || align=right data-sort-value="0.98" | 980 m || 
|-id=110 bgcolor=#E9E9E9
| 363110 ||  || — || November 19, 2000 || Socorro || LINEAR || POS || align=right | 4.0 km || 
|-id=111 bgcolor=#fefefe
| 363111 ||  || — || November 21, 2000 || Socorro || LINEAR || — || align=right | 2.0 km || 
|-id=112 bgcolor=#E9E9E9
| 363112 ||  || — || November 24, 2000 || Anderson Mesa || LONEOS || — || align=right | 2.9 km || 
|-id=113 bgcolor=#fefefe
| 363113 ||  || — || December 3, 2000 || Kitt Peak || Spacewatch || ERI || align=right | 1.9 km || 
|-id=114 bgcolor=#d6d6d6
| 363114 ||  || — || January 15, 2001 || Bergisch Gladbach || W. Bickel || EOS || align=right | 2.1 km || 
|-id=115 bgcolor=#d6d6d6
| 363115 Chuckwood ||  ||  || March 22, 2001 || Kitt Peak || SKADS || THM || align=right | 2.7 km || 
|-id=116 bgcolor=#FFC2E0
| 363116 ||  || — || April 14, 2001 || Socorro || LINEAR || APOPHA || align=right data-sort-value="0.33" | 330 m || 
|-id=117 bgcolor=#E9E9E9
| 363117 ||  || — || June 15, 2001 || Kitt Peak || Spacewatch || — || align=right | 1.8 km || 
|-id=118 bgcolor=#E9E9E9
| 363118 ||  || — || July 14, 2001 || Palomar || NEAT || — || align=right | 1.00 km || 
|-id=119 bgcolor=#E9E9E9
| 363119 ||  || — || July 14, 2001 || Palomar || NEAT || — || align=right | 2.0 km || 
|-id=120 bgcolor=#E9E9E9
| 363120 ||  || — || July 21, 2001 || Haleakala || NEAT || — || align=right | 1.2 km || 
|-id=121 bgcolor=#E9E9E9
| 363121 ||  || — || July 30, 2001 || Palomar || NEAT || — || align=right | 2.0 km || 
|-id=122 bgcolor=#E9E9E9
| 363122 ||  || — || July 22, 2001 || Palomar || NEAT || — || align=right | 1.5 km || 
|-id=123 bgcolor=#E9E9E9
| 363123 ||  || — || August 9, 2001 || Palomar || NEAT || — || align=right | 2.5 km || 
|-id=124 bgcolor=#E9E9E9
| 363124 ||  || — || August 13, 2001 || San Marcello || L. Tesi, M. Tombelli || — || align=right | 1.6 km || 
|-id=125 bgcolor=#E9E9E9
| 363125 ||  || — || August 14, 2001 || Haleakala || NEAT || — || align=right | 2.1 km || 
|-id=126 bgcolor=#E9E9E9
| 363126 ||  || — || August 14, 2001 || Haleakala || NEAT || — || align=right | 1.5 km || 
|-id=127 bgcolor=#E9E9E9
| 363127 ||  || — || August 13, 2001 || Haleakala || NEAT || — || align=right | 1.5 km || 
|-id=128 bgcolor=#E9E9E9
| 363128 ||  || — || August 17, 2001 || Palomar || NEAT || ADE || align=right | 2.5 km || 
|-id=129 bgcolor=#E9E9E9
| 363129 ||  || — || August 16, 2001 || Socorro || LINEAR || — || align=right | 2.4 km || 
|-id=130 bgcolor=#E9E9E9
| 363130 ||  || — || August 17, 2001 || Socorro || LINEAR || — || align=right | 1.4 km || 
|-id=131 bgcolor=#E9E9E9
| 363131 ||  || — || August 20, 2001 || Palomar || NEAT || — || align=right | 1.3 km || 
|-id=132 bgcolor=#E9E9E9
| 363132 ||  || — || August 20, 2001 || Palomar || NEAT || IAN || align=right | 1.3 km || 
|-id=133 bgcolor=#E9E9E9
| 363133 ||  || — || August 22, 2001 || Socorro || LINEAR || — || align=right | 2.6 km || 
|-id=134 bgcolor=#E9E9E9
| 363134 ||  || — || August 22, 2001 || Socorro || LINEAR || — || align=right | 2.8 km || 
|-id=135 bgcolor=#B88A00
| 363135 ||  || — || August 22, 2001 || Palomar || NEAT || unusual || align=right | 16 km || 
|-id=136 bgcolor=#E9E9E9
| 363136 ||  || — || August 23, 2001 || Anderson Mesa || LONEOS || — || align=right | 1.7 km || 
|-id=137 bgcolor=#E9E9E9
| 363137 ||  || — || August 24, 2001 || Anderson Mesa || LONEOS || — || align=right | 1.6 km || 
|-id=138 bgcolor=#E9E9E9
| 363138 ||  || — || August 24, 2001 || Socorro || LINEAR || — || align=right | 2.1 km || 
|-id=139 bgcolor=#E9E9E9
| 363139 ||  || — || August 25, 2001 || Socorro || LINEAR || — || align=right | 2.1 km || 
|-id=140 bgcolor=#E9E9E9
| 363140 ||  || — || August 25, 2001 || Socorro || LINEAR || — || align=right | 2.1 km || 
|-id=141 bgcolor=#E9E9E9
| 363141 ||  || — || August 17, 2001 || Socorro || LINEAR || — || align=right | 1.1 km || 
|-id=142 bgcolor=#E9E9E9
| 363142 ||  || — || August 27, 2001 || Anderson Mesa || LONEOS || JUN || align=right | 1.1 km || 
|-id=143 bgcolor=#E9E9E9
| 363143 ||  || — || September 8, 2001 || Anderson Mesa || LONEOS || — || align=right | 1.8 km || 
|-id=144 bgcolor=#E9E9E9
| 363144 ||  || — || September 8, 2001 || Socorro || LINEAR || — || align=right | 1.0 km || 
|-id=145 bgcolor=#E9E9E9
| 363145 ||  || — || September 10, 2001 || Socorro || LINEAR || — || align=right | 2.2 km || 
|-id=146 bgcolor=#d6d6d6
| 363146 ||  || — || September 11, 2001 || Anderson Mesa || LONEOS || — || align=right | 4.1 km || 
|-id=147 bgcolor=#E9E9E9
| 363147 ||  || — || September 11, 2001 || Anderson Mesa || LONEOS || — || align=right | 1.7 km || 
|-id=148 bgcolor=#E9E9E9
| 363148 ||  || — || September 11, 2001 || Anderson Mesa || LONEOS || — || align=right | 1.6 km || 
|-id=149 bgcolor=#E9E9E9
| 363149 ||  || — || August 25, 2001 || Socorro || LINEAR || — || align=right | 1.4 km || 
|-id=150 bgcolor=#E9E9E9
| 363150 ||  || — || September 16, 2001 || Socorro || LINEAR || — || align=right | 1.4 km || 
|-id=151 bgcolor=#E9E9E9
| 363151 ||  || — || September 16, 2001 || Socorro || LINEAR || — || align=right | 1.6 km || 
|-id=152 bgcolor=#E9E9E9
| 363152 ||  || — || September 17, 2001 || Socorro || LINEAR || — || align=right | 2.6 km || 
|-id=153 bgcolor=#E9E9E9
| 363153 ||  || — || September 17, 2001 || Socorro || LINEAR || — || align=right | 1.6 km || 
|-id=154 bgcolor=#fefefe
| 363154 ||  || — || August 25, 2001 || Socorro || LINEAR || — || align=right data-sort-value="0.79" | 790 m || 
|-id=155 bgcolor=#E9E9E9
| 363155 ||  || — || September 20, 2001 || Socorro || LINEAR || MAR || align=right | 1.0 km || 
|-id=156 bgcolor=#E9E9E9
| 363156 ||  || — || September 20, 2001 || Socorro || LINEAR || — || align=right | 1.3 km || 
|-id=157 bgcolor=#fefefe
| 363157 ||  || — || September 20, 2001 || Socorro || LINEAR || — || align=right data-sort-value="0.78" | 780 m || 
|-id=158 bgcolor=#fefefe
| 363158 ||  || — || September 16, 2001 || Socorro || LINEAR || FLO || align=right data-sort-value="0.46" | 460 m || 
|-id=159 bgcolor=#fefefe
| 363159 ||  || — || September 16, 2001 || Socorro || LINEAR || — || align=right data-sort-value="0.69" | 690 m || 
|-id=160 bgcolor=#E9E9E9
| 363160 ||  || — || September 16, 2001 || Socorro || LINEAR || — || align=right | 1.6 km || 
|-id=161 bgcolor=#fefefe
| 363161 ||  || — || September 19, 2001 || Socorro || LINEAR || — || align=right data-sort-value="0.87" | 870 m || 
|-id=162 bgcolor=#E9E9E9
| 363162 ||  || — || September 19, 2001 || Socorro || LINEAR || — || align=right | 1.8 km || 
|-id=163 bgcolor=#FFC2E0
| 363163 ||  || — || September 27, 2001 || Socorro || LINEAR || AMO +1km || align=right | 1.0 km || 
|-id=164 bgcolor=#E9E9E9
| 363164 ||  || — || September 29, 2001 || Palomar || NEAT || HNS || align=right | 1.8 km || 
|-id=165 bgcolor=#E9E9E9
| 363165 ||  || — || September 20, 2001 || Socorro || LINEAR || — || align=right | 2.8 km || 
|-id=166 bgcolor=#E9E9E9
| 363166 ||  || — || September 23, 2001 || Palomar || NEAT || — || align=right | 1.7 km || 
|-id=167 bgcolor=#E9E9E9
| 363167 ||  || — || September 19, 2001 || Apache Point || SDSS || — || align=right | 2.2 km || 
|-id=168 bgcolor=#E9E9E9
| 363168 ||  || — || October 14, 2001 || Socorro || LINEAR || JUN || align=right | 1.1 km || 
|-id=169 bgcolor=#E9E9E9
| 363169 ||  || — || October 14, 2001 || Socorro || LINEAR || — || align=right | 2.9 km || 
|-id=170 bgcolor=#E9E9E9
| 363170 ||  || — || October 14, 2001 || Socorro || LINEAR || — || align=right | 2.4 km || 
|-id=171 bgcolor=#E9E9E9
| 363171 ||  || — || October 15, 2001 || Desert Eagle || W. K. Y. Yeung || — || align=right | 1.8 km || 
|-id=172 bgcolor=#E9E9E9
| 363172 ||  || — || October 14, 2001 || Socorro || LINEAR || — || align=right | 2.2 km || 
|-id=173 bgcolor=#E9E9E9
| 363173 ||  || — || October 14, 2001 || Socorro || LINEAR || JUN || align=right | 1.3 km || 
|-id=174 bgcolor=#E9E9E9
| 363174 ||  || — || October 14, 2001 || Socorro || LINEAR || — || align=right | 1.8 km || 
|-id=175 bgcolor=#fefefe
| 363175 ||  || — || October 14, 2001 || Socorro || LINEAR || FLO || align=right data-sort-value="0.74" | 740 m || 
|-id=176 bgcolor=#d6d6d6
| 363176 ||  || — || October 13, 2001 || Kitt Peak || Spacewatch || — || align=right | 2.4 km || 
|-id=177 bgcolor=#FA8072
| 363177 ||  || — || October 15, 2001 || Socorro || LINEAR || H || align=right | 1.1 km || 
|-id=178 bgcolor=#fefefe
| 363178 ||  || — || October 14, 2001 || Palomar || NEAT || — || align=right data-sort-value="0.84" | 840 m || 
|-id=179 bgcolor=#fefefe
| 363179 ||  || — || October 10, 2001 || Palomar || NEAT || — || align=right data-sort-value="0.92" | 920 m || 
|-id=180 bgcolor=#E9E9E9
| 363180 ||  || — || October 11, 2001 || Palomar || NEAT || RAF || align=right data-sort-value="0.97" | 970 m || 
|-id=181 bgcolor=#E9E9E9
| 363181 ||  || — || October 13, 2001 || Palomar || NEAT || — || align=right | 2.6 km || 
|-id=182 bgcolor=#E9E9E9
| 363182 ||  || — || September 19, 2001 || Kitt Peak || Spacewatch || HNA || align=right | 1.6 km || 
|-id=183 bgcolor=#E9E9E9
| 363183 ||  || — || October 14, 2001 || Socorro || LINEAR || — || align=right | 1.5 km || 
|-id=184 bgcolor=#E9E9E9
| 363184 ||  || — || October 14, 2001 || Socorro || LINEAR || — || align=right | 1.9 km || 
|-id=185 bgcolor=#E9E9E9
| 363185 ||  || — || October 14, 2001 || Socorro || LINEAR || — || align=right | 2.8 km || 
|-id=186 bgcolor=#E9E9E9
| 363186 ||  || — || October 12, 2001 || Anderson Mesa || LONEOS || — || align=right | 2.8 km || 
|-id=187 bgcolor=#E9E9E9
| 363187 ||  || — || October 15, 2001 || Haleakala || NEAT || — || align=right | 1.3 km || 
|-id=188 bgcolor=#E9E9E9
| 363188 ||  || — || October 15, 2001 || Palomar || NEAT || — || align=right | 1.8 km || 
|-id=189 bgcolor=#E9E9E9
| 363189 ||  || — || October 15, 2001 || Palomar || NEAT || — || align=right | 2.4 km || 
|-id=190 bgcolor=#E9E9E9
| 363190 ||  || — || October 14, 2001 || Apache Point || SDSS || — || align=right | 2.5 km || 
|-id=191 bgcolor=#E9E9E9
| 363191 ||  || — || October 14, 2001 || Apache Point || SDSS || — || align=right | 2.0 km || 
|-id=192 bgcolor=#FA8072
| 363192 ||  || — || October 19, 2001 || Haleakala || NEAT || H || align=right data-sort-value="0.76" | 760 m || 
|-id=193 bgcolor=#FA8072
| 363193 ||  || — || October 21, 2001 || Kitt Peak || Spacewatch || — || align=right data-sort-value="0.59" | 590 m || 
|-id=194 bgcolor=#fefefe
| 363194 ||  || — || October 17, 2001 || Kitt Peak || Spacewatch || — || align=right data-sort-value="0.65" | 650 m || 
|-id=195 bgcolor=#E9E9E9
| 363195 ||  || — || October 17, 2001 || Socorro || LINEAR || — || align=right | 2.0 km || 
|-id=196 bgcolor=#E9E9E9
| 363196 ||  || — || October 17, 2001 || Socorro || LINEAR || — || align=right | 1.4 km || 
|-id=197 bgcolor=#E9E9E9
| 363197 ||  || — || October 17, 2001 || Socorro || LINEAR || — || align=right | 2.4 km || 
|-id=198 bgcolor=#E9E9E9
| 363198 ||  || — || October 20, 2001 || Socorro || LINEAR || — || align=right | 2.8 km || 
|-id=199 bgcolor=#E9E9E9
| 363199 ||  || — || October 20, 2001 || Socorro || LINEAR || — || align=right | 1.7 km || 
|-id=200 bgcolor=#E9E9E9
| 363200 ||  || — || October 21, 2001 || Socorro || LINEAR || — || align=right | 3.1 km || 
|}

363201–363300 

|-bgcolor=#E9E9E9
| 363201 ||  || — || October 22, 2001 || Palomar || NEAT || EUN || align=right | 1.6 km || 
|-id=202 bgcolor=#E9E9E9
| 363202 ||  || — || October 23, 2001 || Palomar || NEAT || — || align=right | 2.0 km || 
|-id=203 bgcolor=#E9E9E9
| 363203 ||  || — || October 21, 2001 || Socorro || LINEAR || — || align=right | 2.2 km || 
|-id=204 bgcolor=#E9E9E9
| 363204 ||  || — || October 22, 2001 || Socorro || LINEAR || — || align=right | 1.7 km || 
|-id=205 bgcolor=#FA8072
| 363205 ||  || — || October 23, 2001 || Socorro || LINEAR || — || align=right | 1.7 km || 
|-id=206 bgcolor=#E9E9E9
| 363206 ||  || — || October 23, 2001 || Socorro || LINEAR || — || align=right | 2.9 km || 
|-id=207 bgcolor=#d6d6d6
| 363207 ||  || — || October 23, 2001 || Socorro || LINEAR || — || align=right | 2.7 km || 
|-id=208 bgcolor=#fefefe
| 363208 ||  || — || September 23, 2001 || Kitt Peak || Spacewatch || H || align=right data-sort-value="0.64" | 640 m || 
|-id=209 bgcolor=#fefefe
| 363209 ||  || — || October 18, 2001 || Palomar || NEAT || — || align=right data-sort-value="0.76" | 760 m || 
|-id=210 bgcolor=#fefefe
| 363210 ||  || — || October 14, 2001 || Socorro || LINEAR || — || align=right data-sort-value="0.93" | 930 m || 
|-id=211 bgcolor=#E9E9E9
| 363211 ||  || — || October 25, 2001 || Socorro || LINEAR || — || align=right | 1.8 km || 
|-id=212 bgcolor=#E9E9E9
| 363212 ||  || — || October 18, 2001 || Palomar || NEAT || INO || align=right | 1.2 km || 
|-id=213 bgcolor=#E9E9E9
| 363213 ||  || — || October 16, 2001 || Palomar || NEAT || — || align=right | 1.8 km || 
|-id=214 bgcolor=#E9E9E9
| 363214 ||  || — || October 19, 2001 || Palomar || NEAT || — || align=right | 1.5 km || 
|-id=215 bgcolor=#E9E9E9
| 363215 ||  || — || February 28, 2008 || Kitt Peak || Spacewatch || WIT || align=right | 1.0 km || 
|-id=216 bgcolor=#E9E9E9
| 363216 ||  || — || November 9, 2001 || Socorro || LINEAR || — || align=right | 2.1 km || 
|-id=217 bgcolor=#fefefe
| 363217 ||  || — || November 10, 2001 || Socorro || LINEAR || — || align=right data-sort-value="0.85" | 850 m || 
|-id=218 bgcolor=#FA8072
| 363218 ||  || — || November 15, 2001 || Socorro || LINEAR || — || align=right | 1.5 km || 
|-id=219 bgcolor=#fefefe
| 363219 ||  || — || November 9, 2001 || Palomar || NEAT || FLO || align=right data-sort-value="0.74" | 740 m || 
|-id=220 bgcolor=#fefefe
| 363220 ||  || — || November 10, 2001 || Palomar || NEAT || — || align=right data-sort-value="0.98" | 980 m || 
|-id=221 bgcolor=#FA8072
| 363221 ||  || — || November 12, 2001 || Socorro || LINEAR || — || align=right | 1.1 km || 
|-id=222 bgcolor=#E9E9E9
| 363222 ||  || — || November 10, 2001 || Socorro || LINEAR || — || align=right | 3.5 km || 
|-id=223 bgcolor=#FA8072
| 363223 ||  || — || November 12, 2001 || Socorro || LINEAR || — || align=right data-sort-value="0.68" | 680 m || 
|-id=224 bgcolor=#E9E9E9
| 363224 ||  || — || November 13, 2001 || Haleakala || NEAT || — || align=right | 2.2 km || 
|-id=225 bgcolor=#d6d6d6
| 363225 ||  || — || November 14, 2001 || Kitt Peak || Spacewatch || EOS || align=right | 1.8 km || 
|-id=226 bgcolor=#FA8072
| 363226 ||  || — || November 17, 2001 || Kitt Peak || Spacewatch || — || align=right data-sort-value="0.60" | 600 m || 
|-id=227 bgcolor=#E9E9E9
| 363227 ||  || — || October 23, 2001 || Socorro || LINEAR || — || align=right | 2.5 km || 
|-id=228 bgcolor=#E9E9E9
| 363228 ||  || — || November 19, 2001 || Socorro || LINEAR || — || align=right | 1.7 km || 
|-id=229 bgcolor=#E9E9E9
| 363229 ||  || — || November 20, 2001 || Socorro || LINEAR || BAR || align=right | 1.8 km || 
|-id=230 bgcolor=#E9E9E9
| 363230 ||  || — || November 18, 2001 || Kitt Peak || Spacewatch || — || align=right | 2.5 km || 
|-id=231 bgcolor=#E9E9E9
| 363231 ||  || — || December 9, 2001 || Socorro || LINEAR || — || align=right | 2.7 km || 
|-id=232 bgcolor=#E9E9E9
| 363232 ||  || — || December 9, 2001 || Socorro || LINEAR || BAR || align=right | 2.7 km || 
|-id=233 bgcolor=#E9E9E9
| 363233 ||  || — || December 11, 2001 || Socorro || LINEAR || — || align=right | 2.5 km || 
|-id=234 bgcolor=#fefefe
| 363234 ||  || — || December 14, 2001 || Socorro || LINEAR || — || align=right | 1.0 km || 
|-id=235 bgcolor=#fefefe
| 363235 ||  || — || December 15, 2001 || Socorro || LINEAR || — || align=right data-sort-value="0.90" | 900 m || 
|-id=236 bgcolor=#E9E9E9
| 363236 ||  || — || December 13, 2001 || Palomar || NEAT || — || align=right | 1.8 km || 
|-id=237 bgcolor=#FA8072
| 363237 ||  || — || December 17, 2001 || Socorro || LINEAR || — || align=right | 1.4 km || 
|-id=238 bgcolor=#fefefe
| 363238 ||  || — || December 22, 2001 || Socorro || LINEAR || H || align=right data-sort-value="0.71" | 710 m || 
|-id=239 bgcolor=#fefefe
| 363239 ||  || — || December 19, 2001 || Palomar || NEAT || FLO || align=right data-sort-value="0.79" | 790 m || 
|-id=240 bgcolor=#fefefe
| 363240 ||  || — || January 9, 2002 || Socorro || LINEAR || — || align=right data-sort-value="0.75" | 750 m || 
|-id=241 bgcolor=#fefefe
| 363241 ||  || — || January 9, 2002 || Socorro || LINEAR || — || align=right data-sort-value="0.67" | 670 m || 
|-id=242 bgcolor=#fefefe
| 363242 ||  || — || January 9, 2002 || Socorro || LINEAR || — || align=right data-sort-value="0.65" | 650 m || 
|-id=243 bgcolor=#fefefe
| 363243 ||  || — || January 14, 2002 || Socorro || LINEAR || H || align=right data-sort-value="0.89" | 890 m || 
|-id=244 bgcolor=#fefefe
| 363244 ||  || — || January 8, 2002 || Socorro || LINEAR || H || align=right data-sort-value="0.89" | 890 m || 
|-id=245 bgcolor=#E9E9E9
| 363245 ||  || — || December 18, 2001 || Socorro || LINEAR || — || align=right | 2.6 km || 
|-id=246 bgcolor=#fefefe
| 363246 ||  || — || January 14, 2002 || Socorro || LINEAR || — || align=right data-sort-value="0.91" | 910 m || 
|-id=247 bgcolor=#fefefe
| 363247 ||  || — || January 19, 2002 || Anderson Mesa || LONEOS || H || align=right data-sort-value="0.89" | 890 m || 
|-id=248 bgcolor=#fefefe
| 363248 ||  || — || January 19, 2002 || Socorro || LINEAR || H || align=right data-sort-value="0.75" | 750 m || 
|-id=249 bgcolor=#fefefe
| 363249 ||  || — || February 5, 2002 || Haleakala || NEAT || PHO || align=right | 1.4 km || 
|-id=250 bgcolor=#d6d6d6
| 363250 ||  || — || February 6, 2002 || Socorro || LINEAR || TEL || align=right | 1.9 km || 
|-id=251 bgcolor=#d6d6d6
| 363251 ||  || — || January 9, 2002 || Socorro || LINEAR || — || align=right | 2.9 km || 
|-id=252 bgcolor=#fefefe
| 363252 ||  || — || February 7, 2002 || Socorro || LINEAR || — || align=right data-sort-value="0.91" | 910 m || 
|-id=253 bgcolor=#E9E9E9
| 363253 ||  || — || February 7, 2002 || Socorro || LINEAR || — || align=right | 2.1 km || 
|-id=254 bgcolor=#fefefe
| 363254 ||  || — || February 7, 2002 || Socorro || LINEAR || NYS || align=right data-sort-value="0.68" | 680 m || 
|-id=255 bgcolor=#fefefe
| 363255 ||  || — || February 10, 2002 || Socorro || LINEAR || — || align=right data-sort-value="0.65" | 650 m || 
|-id=256 bgcolor=#fefefe
| 363256 ||  || — || February 10, 2002 || Socorro || LINEAR || — || align=right data-sort-value="0.81" | 810 m || 
|-id=257 bgcolor=#fefefe
| 363257 ||  || — || February 13, 2002 || Kitt Peak || Spacewatch || — || align=right data-sort-value="0.56" | 560 m || 
|-id=258 bgcolor=#fefefe
| 363258 ||  || — || February 8, 2002 || Kitt Peak || M. W. Buie || — || align=right data-sort-value="0.65" | 650 m || 
|-id=259 bgcolor=#d6d6d6
| 363259 ||  || — || February 8, 2002 || Kitt Peak || Spacewatch || EOS || align=right | 1.8 km || 
|-id=260 bgcolor=#fefefe
| 363260 ||  || — || January 22, 2002 || Socorro || LINEAR || — || align=right | 1.3 km || 
|-id=261 bgcolor=#fefefe
| 363261 ||  || — || February 16, 2002 || Palomar || NEAT || FLO || align=right data-sort-value="0.78" | 780 m || 
|-id=262 bgcolor=#fefefe
| 363262 ||  || — || March 9, 2002 || Palomar || NEAT || PHO || align=right data-sort-value="0.99" | 990 m || 
|-id=263 bgcolor=#fefefe
| 363263 ||  || — || March 10, 2002 || Cima Ekar || ADAS || ERI || align=right | 2.0 km || 
|-id=264 bgcolor=#fefefe
| 363264 ||  || — || March 6, 2002 || Palomar || NEAT || ERI || align=right | 1.6 km || 
|-id=265 bgcolor=#fefefe
| 363265 ||  || — || March 15, 2002 || Palomar || NEAT || — || align=right data-sort-value="0.88" | 880 m || 
|-id=266 bgcolor=#fefefe
| 363266 ||  || — || March 4, 2002 || Palomar || NEAT || — || align=right data-sort-value="0.71" | 710 m || 
|-id=267 bgcolor=#FFC2E0
| 363267 ||  || — || April 3, 2002 || Anderson Mesa || LONEOS || APO || align=right data-sort-value="0.37" | 370 m || 
|-id=268 bgcolor=#d6d6d6
| 363268 ||  || — || April 5, 2002 || Palomar || NEAT || — || align=right | 3.9 km || 
|-id=269 bgcolor=#d6d6d6
| 363269 ||  || — || April 9, 2002 || Palomar || NEAT || EUP || align=right | 3.3 km || 
|-id=270 bgcolor=#fefefe
| 363270 ||  || — || April 8, 2002 || Kitt Peak || Spacewatch || PHO || align=right | 1.1 km || 
|-id=271 bgcolor=#fefefe
| 363271 ||  || — || March 23, 2002 || Socorro || LINEAR || ERI || align=right | 1.7 km || 
|-id=272 bgcolor=#fefefe
| 363272 ||  || — || April 1, 2002 || Palomar || NEAT || ERI || align=right | 2.4 km || 
|-id=273 bgcolor=#d6d6d6
| 363273 ||  || — || April 5, 2002 || Anderson Mesa || LONEOS || — || align=right | 3.2 km || 
|-id=274 bgcolor=#fefefe
| 363274 ||  || — || April 8, 2002 || Palomar || NEAT || MAS || align=right data-sort-value="0.76" | 760 m || 
|-id=275 bgcolor=#fefefe
| 363275 ||  || — || April 10, 2002 || Socorro || LINEAR || V || align=right data-sort-value="0.88" | 880 m || 
|-id=276 bgcolor=#fefefe
| 363276 ||  || — || April 9, 2002 || Socorro || LINEAR || ERI || align=right | 1.6 km || 
|-id=277 bgcolor=#fefefe
| 363277 ||  || — || April 11, 2002 || Socorro || LINEAR || — || align=right data-sort-value="0.89" | 890 m || 
|-id=278 bgcolor=#fefefe
| 363278 ||  || — || April 11, 2002 || Socorro || LINEAR || ERI || align=right | 1.5 km || 
|-id=279 bgcolor=#fefefe
| 363279 ||  || — || April 12, 2002 || Palomar || NEAT || V || align=right data-sort-value="0.81" | 810 m || 
|-id=280 bgcolor=#d6d6d6
| 363280 ||  || — || April 12, 2002 || Socorro || LINEAR || — || align=right | 2.6 km || 
|-id=281 bgcolor=#d6d6d6
| 363281 ||  || — || April 12, 2002 || Palomar || NEAT || — || align=right | 3.1 km || 
|-id=282 bgcolor=#d6d6d6
| 363282 ||  || — || April 15, 2002 || Socorro || LINEAR || — || align=right | 3.1 km || 
|-id=283 bgcolor=#d6d6d6
| 363283 ||  || — || April 9, 2002 || Socorro || LINEAR || MEL || align=right | 4.7 km || 
|-id=284 bgcolor=#fefefe
| 363284 ||  || — || April 13, 2002 || Palomar || NEAT || ERI || align=right | 1.5 km || 
|-id=285 bgcolor=#d6d6d6
| 363285 ||  || — || April 2, 2002 || Palomar || NEAT || — || align=right | 3.7 km || 
|-id=286 bgcolor=#d6d6d6
| 363286 ||  || — || April 12, 2002 || Palomar || NEAT || — || align=right | 3.4 km || 
|-id=287 bgcolor=#fefefe
| 363287 ||  || — || October 18, 2007 || Mount Lemmon || Mount Lemmon Survey || — || align=right data-sort-value="0.72" | 720 m || 
|-id=288 bgcolor=#d6d6d6
| 363288 ||  || — || March 20, 2002 || Kitt Peak || Spacewatch || EMA || align=right | 3.2 km || 
|-id=289 bgcolor=#fefefe
| 363289 ||  || — || May 9, 2002 || Socorro || LINEAR || — || align=right | 1.0 km || 
|-id=290 bgcolor=#fefefe
| 363290 ||  || — || May 9, 2002 || Socorro || LINEAR || H || align=right data-sort-value="0.69" | 690 m || 
|-id=291 bgcolor=#d6d6d6
| 363291 ||  || — || May 11, 2002 || Socorro || LINEAR || — || align=right | 6.4 km || 
|-id=292 bgcolor=#fefefe
| 363292 ||  || — || May 11, 2002 || Socorro || LINEAR || — || align=right data-sort-value="0.83" | 830 m || 
|-id=293 bgcolor=#fefefe
| 363293 ||  || — || May 11, 2002 || Socorro || LINEAR || — || align=right data-sort-value="0.99" | 990 m || 
|-id=294 bgcolor=#d6d6d6
| 363294 ||  || — || April 21, 2002 || Palomar || NEAT || — || align=right | 3.6 km || 
|-id=295 bgcolor=#fefefe
| 363295 ||  || — || May 5, 2002 || Palomar || NEAT || — || align=right | 1.3 km || 
|-id=296 bgcolor=#fefefe
| 363296 ||  || — || April 11, 2002 || Palomar || NEAT || H || align=right data-sort-value="0.84" | 840 m || 
|-id=297 bgcolor=#d6d6d6
| 363297 ||  || — || May 6, 2002 || Palomar || NEAT || — || align=right | 4.2 km || 
|-id=298 bgcolor=#FFC2E0
| 363298 ||  || — || May 18, 2002 || Socorro || LINEAR || APO || align=right data-sort-value="0.75" | 750 m || 
|-id=299 bgcolor=#d6d6d6
| 363299 ||  || — || June 1, 2002 || Palomar || NEAT || TIR || align=right | 4.3 km || 
|-id=300 bgcolor=#FA8072
| 363300 ||  || — || June 10, 2002 || Socorro || LINEAR || — || align=right data-sort-value="0.94" | 940 m || 
|}

363301–363400 

|-bgcolor=#fefefe
| 363301 ||  || — || June 3, 2002 || Palomar || NEAT || — || align=right data-sort-value="0.91" | 910 m || 
|-id=302 bgcolor=#fefefe
| 363302 ||  || — || July 5, 2002 || Socorro || LINEAR || — || align=right | 3.2 km || 
|-id=303 bgcolor=#d6d6d6
| 363303 ||  || — || November 5, 2010 || Mount Lemmon || Mount Lemmon Survey || — || align=right | 3.7 km || 
|-id=304 bgcolor=#d6d6d6
| 363304 ||  || — || July 9, 2002 || Palomar || NEAT || — || align=right | 3.6 km || 
|-id=305 bgcolor=#FFC2E0
| 363305 ||  || — || July 13, 2002 || Socorro || LINEAR || APOPHAfast || align=right data-sort-value="0.19" | 190 m || 
|-id=306 bgcolor=#d6d6d6
| 363306 ||  || — || July 9, 2002 || Socorro || LINEAR || — || align=right | 5.3 km || 
|-id=307 bgcolor=#fefefe
| 363307 ||  || — || July 12, 2002 || Palomar || NEAT || SUL || align=right | 2.9 km || 
|-id=308 bgcolor=#d6d6d6
| 363308 ||  || — || July 14, 2002 || Palomar || NEAT || — || align=right | 2.7 km || 
|-id=309 bgcolor=#fefefe
| 363309 ||  || — || July 5, 2002 || Kitt Peak || Spacewatch || MAS || align=right data-sort-value="0.72" | 720 m || 
|-id=310 bgcolor=#fefefe
| 363310 ||  || — || July 1, 2002 || Palomar || NEAT || — || align=right data-sort-value="0.92" | 920 m || 
|-id=311 bgcolor=#fefefe
| 363311 ||  || — || July 8, 2002 || Palomar || NEAT || NYS || align=right data-sort-value="0.68" | 680 m || 
|-id=312 bgcolor=#E9E9E9
| 363312 ||  || — || July 12, 2002 || Palomar || NEAT || EUN || align=right | 1.1 km || 
|-id=313 bgcolor=#fefefe
| 363313 ||  || — || July 3, 2002 || Palomar || NEAT || — || align=right data-sort-value="0.67" | 670 m || 
|-id=314 bgcolor=#fefefe
| 363314 ||  || — || September 14, 2006 || Catalina || CSS || — || align=right | 1.9 km || 
|-id=315 bgcolor=#d6d6d6
| 363315 ||  || — || February 3, 2010 || WISE || WISE || EUP || align=right | 6.1 km || 
|-id=316 bgcolor=#d6d6d6
| 363316 ||  || — || January 19, 2012 || Mount Lemmon || Mount Lemmon Survey || — || align=right | 3.3 km || 
|-id=317 bgcolor=#fefefe
| 363317 ||  || — || July 18, 2002 || Palomar || NEAT || — || align=right data-sort-value="0.63" | 630 m || 
|-id=318 bgcolor=#E9E9E9
| 363318 ||  || — || July 18, 2002 || Socorro || LINEAR || — || align=right | 1.2 km || 
|-id=319 bgcolor=#fefefe
| 363319 ||  || — || July 21, 2002 || Palomar || NEAT || — || align=right data-sort-value="0.59" | 590 m || 
|-id=320 bgcolor=#fefefe
| 363320 ||  || — || July 22, 2002 || Palomar || NEAT || — || align=right | 1.5 km || 
|-id=321 bgcolor=#d6d6d6
| 363321 ||  || — || August 3, 2002 || Palomar || NEAT || — || align=right | 3.5 km || 
|-id=322 bgcolor=#fefefe
| 363322 ||  || — || August 6, 2002 || Palomar || NEAT || — || align=right data-sort-value="0.95" | 950 m || 
|-id=323 bgcolor=#d6d6d6
| 363323 ||  || — || August 9, 2002 || Socorro || LINEAR || Tj (2.95) || align=right | 4.1 km || 
|-id=324 bgcolor=#fefefe
| 363324 ||  || — || August 5, 2002 || Palomar || NEAT || — || align=right | 1.1 km || 
|-id=325 bgcolor=#E9E9E9
| 363325 ||  || — || July 18, 2002 || Palomar || NEAT || — || align=right | 1.2 km || 
|-id=326 bgcolor=#fefefe
| 363326 ||  || — || August 5, 2002 || Palomar || NEAT || LCI || align=right data-sort-value="0.97" | 970 m || 
|-id=327 bgcolor=#fefefe
| 363327 ||  || — || August 13, 2002 || Kitt Peak || Spacewatch || — || align=right data-sort-value="0.68" | 680 m || 
|-id=328 bgcolor=#d6d6d6
| 363328 ||  || — || August 5, 2002 || Palomar || NEAT || EOS || align=right | 2.3 km || 
|-id=329 bgcolor=#fefefe
| 363329 ||  || — || August 15, 2002 || Palomar || NEAT || V || align=right data-sort-value="0.64" | 640 m || 
|-id=330 bgcolor=#C2E0FF
| 363330 ||  || — || August 9, 2002 || Cerro Tololo || M. W. Buie || cubewano (cold)critical || align=right | 300 km || 
|-id=331 bgcolor=#fefefe
| 363331 ||  || — || August 8, 2002 || Palomar || NEAT || MAS || align=right data-sort-value="0.81" | 810 m || 
|-id=332 bgcolor=#d6d6d6
| 363332 ||  || — || August 8, 2002 || Palomar || S. F. Hönig || 7:4 || align=right | 3.1 km || 
|-id=333 bgcolor=#fefefe
| 363333 ||  || — || August 8, 2002 || Palomar || S. F. Hönig || MAS || align=right data-sort-value="0.73" | 730 m || 
|-id=334 bgcolor=#fefefe
| 363334 ||  || — || August 8, 2002 || Palomar || NEAT || NYS || align=right data-sort-value="0.49" | 490 m || 
|-id=335 bgcolor=#d6d6d6
| 363335 ||  || — || August 7, 2002 || Palomar || NEAT || EOS || align=right | 2.5 km || 
|-id=336 bgcolor=#d6d6d6
| 363336 ||  || — || August 4, 2002 || Palomar || NEAT || EOS || align=right | 3.0 km || 
|-id=337 bgcolor=#fefefe
| 363337 ||  || — || August 8, 2002 || Palomar || NEAT || — || align=right data-sort-value="0.70" | 700 m || 
|-id=338 bgcolor=#E9E9E9
| 363338 ||  || — || August 15, 2002 || Palomar || NEAT || — || align=right | 2.9 km || 
|-id=339 bgcolor=#E9E9E9
| 363339 ||  || — || August 15, 2002 || Palomar || NEAT || EUN || align=right | 1.4 km || 
|-id=340 bgcolor=#fefefe
| 363340 ||  || — || August 6, 2002 || Palomar || NEAT || NYS || align=right data-sort-value="0.63" | 630 m || 
|-id=341 bgcolor=#d6d6d6
| 363341 ||  || — || August 16, 2002 || Haleakala || NEAT || — || align=right | 4.5 km || 
|-id=342 bgcolor=#d6d6d6
| 363342 ||  || — || August 16, 2002 || Palomar || NEAT || HYG || align=right | 3.1 km || 
|-id=343 bgcolor=#d6d6d6
| 363343 ||  || — || August 17, 2002 || Socorro || LINEAR || Tj (2.97) || align=right | 6.2 km || 
|-id=344 bgcolor=#FFC2E0
| 363344 ||  || — || August 19, 2002 || Palomar || NEAT || APOPHA || align=right data-sort-value="0.36" | 360 m || 
|-id=345 bgcolor=#fefefe
| 363345 ||  || — || August 29, 2002 || Palomar || S. F. Hönig || NYS || align=right data-sort-value="0.56" | 560 m || 
|-id=346 bgcolor=#E9E9E9
| 363346 ||  || — || August 16, 2002 || Palomar || NEAT || — || align=right | 1.0 km || 
|-id=347 bgcolor=#E9E9E9
| 363347 ||  || — || August 19, 2002 || Palomar || NEAT || KRM || align=right | 2.3 km || 
|-id=348 bgcolor=#E9E9E9
| 363348 ||  || — || August 16, 2002 || Palomar || NEAT || — || align=right data-sort-value="0.98" | 980 m || 
|-id=349 bgcolor=#d6d6d6
| 363349 ||  || — || August 19, 2002 || Palomar || NEAT || — || align=right | 2.0 km || 
|-id=350 bgcolor=#fefefe
| 363350 ||  || — || August 30, 2002 || Palomar || NEAT || — || align=right data-sort-value="0.94" | 940 m || 
|-id=351 bgcolor=#d6d6d6
| 363351 ||  || — || October 8, 2008 || Mount Lemmon || Mount Lemmon Survey || — || align=right | 3.1 km || 
|-id=352 bgcolor=#E9E9E9
| 363352 ||  || — || December 19, 2007 || Mount Lemmon || Mount Lemmon Survey || — || align=right | 1.3 km || 
|-id=353 bgcolor=#fefefe
| 363353 ||  || — || September 4, 2002 || Anderson Mesa || LONEOS || — || align=right | 1.1 km || 
|-id=354 bgcolor=#fefefe
| 363354 ||  || — || September 5, 2002 || Socorro || LINEAR || MAS || align=right data-sort-value="0.88" | 880 m || 
|-id=355 bgcolor=#d6d6d6
| 363355 ||  || — || September 10, 2002 || Palomar || NEAT || — || align=right | 2.2 km || 
|-id=356 bgcolor=#d6d6d6
| 363356 ||  || — || September 11, 2002 || Palomar || NEAT || — || align=right | 4.4 km || 
|-id=357 bgcolor=#E9E9E9
| 363357 ||  || — || September 4, 2002 || Anderson Mesa || LONEOS || — || align=right | 2.7 km || 
|-id=358 bgcolor=#E9E9E9
| 363358 ||  || — || September 14, 2002 || Palomar || NEAT || — || align=right data-sort-value="0.95" | 950 m || 
|-id=359 bgcolor=#fefefe
| 363359 ||  || — || September 15, 2002 || Palomar || NEAT || — || align=right data-sort-value="0.93" | 930 m || 
|-id=360 bgcolor=#E9E9E9
| 363360 ||  || — || September 4, 2002 || Palomar || NEAT || — || align=right data-sort-value="0.78" | 780 m || 
|-id=361 bgcolor=#d6d6d6
| 363361 ||  || — || September 3, 2002 || Haleakala || NEAT || EOS || align=right | 2.7 km || 
|-id=362 bgcolor=#fefefe
| 363362 ||  || — || September 26, 2002 || Palomar || NEAT || — || align=right data-sort-value="0.86" | 860 m || 
|-id=363 bgcolor=#E9E9E9
| 363363 ||  || — || September 28, 2002 || Haleakala || NEAT || — || align=right | 2.9 km || 
|-id=364 bgcolor=#fefefe
| 363364 ||  || — || September 29, 2002 || Haleakala || NEAT || MAS || align=right data-sort-value="0.85" | 850 m || 
|-id=365 bgcolor=#fefefe
| 363365 ||  || — || September 16, 2002 || Palomar || NEAT || MAS || align=right data-sort-value="0.79" | 790 m || 
|-id=366 bgcolor=#fefefe
| 363366 ||  || — || October 1, 2002 || Anderson Mesa || LONEOS || NYS || align=right data-sort-value="0.70" | 700 m || 
|-id=367 bgcolor=#E9E9E9
| 363367 ||  || — || October 2, 2002 || Socorro || LINEAR || — || align=right | 1.3 km || 
|-id=368 bgcolor=#FA8072
| 363368 ||  || — || October 2, 2002 || Socorro || LINEAR || — || align=right | 1.3 km || 
|-id=369 bgcolor=#FA8072
| 363369 ||  || — || October 2, 2002 || Socorro || LINEAR || — || align=right | 1.3 km || 
|-id=370 bgcolor=#d6d6d6
| 363370 ||  || — || October 4, 2002 || Anderson Mesa || LONEOS || THB || align=right | 7.1 km || 
|-id=371 bgcolor=#d6d6d6
| 363371 ||  || — || October 4, 2002 || Anderson Mesa || LONEOS || — || align=right | 4.1 km || 
|-id=372 bgcolor=#fefefe
| 363372 ||  || — || October 13, 2002 || Palomar || NEAT || — || align=right | 1.4 km || 
|-id=373 bgcolor=#E9E9E9
| 363373 ||  || — || October 3, 2002 || Socorro || LINEAR || KAZ || align=right | 1.2 km || 
|-id=374 bgcolor=#E9E9E9
| 363374 ||  || — || October 10, 2002 || Socorro || LINEAR || — || align=right | 2.9 km || 
|-id=375 bgcolor=#E9E9E9
| 363375 ||  || — || October 4, 2002 || Apache Point || SDSS || — || align=right | 1.2 km || 
|-id=376 bgcolor=#E9E9E9
| 363376 ||  || — || October 4, 2002 || Apache Point || SDSS || — || align=right | 1.1 km || 
|-id=377 bgcolor=#d6d6d6
| 363377 ||  || — || October 10, 2002 || Apache Point || SDSS || EOS || align=right | 2.7 km || 
|-id=378 bgcolor=#E9E9E9
| 363378 ||  || — || October 10, 2002 || Apache Point || SDSS || — || align=right | 1.9 km || 
|-id=379 bgcolor=#E9E9E9
| 363379 ||  || — || October 10, 2002 || Apache Point || SDSS || — || align=right | 1.9 km || 
|-id=380 bgcolor=#E9E9E9
| 363380 ||  || — || October 4, 2002 || Palomar || NEAT || — || align=right | 1.2 km || 
|-id=381 bgcolor=#fefefe
| 363381 ||  || — || October 4, 2002 || Apache Point || SDSS || — || align=right data-sort-value="0.91" | 910 m || 
|-id=382 bgcolor=#fefefe
| 363382 ||  || — || October 31, 2002 || Palomar || NEAT || — || align=right | 1.0 km || 
|-id=383 bgcolor=#E9E9E9
| 363383 ||  || — || November 4, 2002 || Kitt Peak || Spacewatch || — || align=right | 1.6 km || 
|-id=384 bgcolor=#E9E9E9
| 363384 ||  || — || November 5, 2002 || Palomar || NEAT || — || align=right | 1.4 km || 
|-id=385 bgcolor=#E9E9E9
| 363385 ||  || — || November 24, 2002 || Palomar || NEAT || EUN || align=right | 1.3 km || 
|-id=386 bgcolor=#E9E9E9
| 363386 ||  || — || October 30, 2002 || Haleakala || NEAT || — || align=right | 1.7 km || 
|-id=387 bgcolor=#E9E9E9
| 363387 ||  || — || November 24, 2002 || Palomar || NEAT || EUN || align=right | 1.4 km || 
|-id=388 bgcolor=#d6d6d6
| 363388 ||  || — || December 6, 2002 || Socorro || LINEAR || EUP || align=right | 8.0 km || 
|-id=389 bgcolor=#E9E9E9
| 363389 ||  || — || December 10, 2002 || Palomar || NEAT || — || align=right | 1.1 km || 
|-id=390 bgcolor=#E9E9E9
| 363390 ||  || — || December 10, 2002 || Socorro || LINEAR || — || align=right | 2.1 km || 
|-id=391 bgcolor=#E9E9E9
| 363391 ||  || — || December 10, 2002 || Socorro || LINEAR || CLO || align=right | 2.9 km || 
|-id=392 bgcolor=#E9E9E9
| 363392 ||  || — || December 12, 2002 || Palomar || NEAT || — || align=right | 1.9 km || 
|-id=393 bgcolor=#E9E9E9
| 363393 ||  || — || December 31, 2002 || Socorro || LINEAR || — || align=right | 2.5 km || 
|-id=394 bgcolor=#E9E9E9
| 363394 ||  || — || January 4, 2003 || Socorro || LINEAR || — || align=right | 1.8 km || 
|-id=395 bgcolor=#E9E9E9
| 363395 ||  || — || January 30, 2003 || Palomar || NEAT || HNA || align=right | 2.6 km || 
|-id=396 bgcolor=#fefefe
| 363396 ||  || — || January 29, 2003 || Palomar || Palomar Obs. || — || align=right data-sort-value="0.78" | 780 m || 
|-id=397 bgcolor=#d6d6d6
| 363397 ||  || — || April 28, 2003 || Socorro || LINEAR || THB || align=right | 4.2 km || 
|-id=398 bgcolor=#d6d6d6
| 363398 ||  || — || May 1, 2003 || Kitt Peak || Spacewatch || — || align=right | 2.5 km || 
|-id=399 bgcolor=#fefefe
| 363399 ||  || — || May 2, 2003 || Kitt Peak || Spacewatch || FLO || align=right data-sort-value="0.68" | 680 m || 
|-id=400 bgcolor=#fefefe
| 363400 ||  || — || May 28, 2003 || Kitt Peak || Spacewatch || H || align=right data-sort-value="0.68" | 680 m || 
|}

363401–363500 

|-bgcolor=#C2E0FF
| 363401 ||  || — || June 1, 2003 || Cerro Tololo || M. W. Buie || cubewano (cold)critical || align=right | 203 km || 
|-id=402 bgcolor=#FA8072
| 363402 ||  || — || June 25, 2003 || Socorro || LINEAR || — || align=right | 3.7 km || 
|-id=403 bgcolor=#FA8072
| 363403 ||  || — || July 26, 2003 || Pla D'Arguines || R. Ferrando || — || align=right data-sort-value="0.80" | 800 m || 
|-id=404 bgcolor=#fefefe
| 363404 ||  || — || July 21, 2003 || Palomar || NEAT || H || align=right data-sort-value="0.89" | 890 m || 
|-id=405 bgcolor=#d6d6d6
| 363405 ||  || — || July 28, 2003 || Reedy Creek || J. Broughton || — || align=right | 4.6 km || 
|-id=406 bgcolor=#fefefe
| 363406 ||  || — || July 24, 2003 || Palomar || NEAT || — || align=right data-sort-value="0.78" | 780 m || 
|-id=407 bgcolor=#FA8072
| 363407 ||  || — || August 19, 2003 || Campo Imperatore || CINEOS || — || align=right data-sort-value="0.64" | 640 m || 
|-id=408 bgcolor=#fefefe
| 363408 ||  || — || August 22, 2003 || Palomar || NEAT || — || align=right data-sort-value="0.92" | 920 m || 
|-id=409 bgcolor=#fefefe
| 363409 ||  || — || July 23, 2003 || Palomar || NEAT || — || align=right data-sort-value="0.91" | 910 m || 
|-id=410 bgcolor=#d6d6d6
| 363410 ||  || — || August 22, 2003 || Črni Vrh || Črni Vrh || — || align=right | 4.5 km || 
|-id=411 bgcolor=#fefefe
| 363411 ||  || — || August 24, 2003 || Črni Vrh || Črni Vrh || — || align=right | 1.1 km || 
|-id=412 bgcolor=#d6d6d6
| 363412 ||  || — || August 22, 2003 || Palomar || NEAT || ALA || align=right | 3.8 km || 
|-id=413 bgcolor=#fefefe
| 363413 ||  || — || August 23, 2003 || Palomar || NEAT || — || align=right | 1.0 km || 
|-id=414 bgcolor=#fefefe
| 363414 ||  || — || August 23, 2003 || Socorro || LINEAR || NYS || align=right | 1.0 km || 
|-id=415 bgcolor=#fefefe
| 363415 ||  || — || August 4, 2003 || Kitt Peak || Spacewatch || NYS || align=right data-sort-value="0.69" | 690 m || 
|-id=416 bgcolor=#d6d6d6
| 363416 ||  || — || August 30, 2003 || Socorro || LINEAR || — || align=right | 4.1 km || 
|-id=417 bgcolor=#d6d6d6
| 363417 ||  || — || August 25, 2003 || Socorro || LINEAR || URS || align=right | 4.5 km || 
|-id=418 bgcolor=#fefefe
| 363418 ||  || — || August 31, 2003 || Socorro || LINEAR || — || align=right | 1.8 km || 
|-id=419 bgcolor=#fefefe
| 363419 ||  || — || August 31, 2003 || Socorro || LINEAR || — || align=right data-sort-value="0.99" | 990 m || 
|-id=420 bgcolor=#d6d6d6
| 363420 ||  || — || August 31, 2003 || Socorro || LINEAR || EUP || align=right | 5.6 km || 
|-id=421 bgcolor=#FA8072
| 363421 ||  || — || September 6, 2003 || Anderson Mesa || LONEOS || — || align=right | 1.1 km || 
|-id=422 bgcolor=#d6d6d6
| 363422 ||  || — || September 15, 2003 || Palomar || NEAT || — || align=right | 4.7 km || 
|-id=423 bgcolor=#fefefe
| 363423 ||  || — || September 13, 2003 || Haleakala || NEAT || — || align=right | 1.0 km || 
|-id=424 bgcolor=#d6d6d6
| 363424 ||  || — || September 13, 2003 || Anderson Mesa || LONEOS || — || align=right | 2.8 km || 
|-id=425 bgcolor=#d6d6d6
| 363425 ||  || — || September 15, 2003 || Anderson Mesa || LONEOS || HYG || align=right | 3.7 km || 
|-id=426 bgcolor=#fefefe
| 363426 ||  || — || September 17, 2003 || Kitt Peak || Spacewatch || — || align=right data-sort-value="0.74" | 740 m || 
|-id=427 bgcolor=#d6d6d6
| 363427 ||  || — || September 16, 2003 || Haleakala || NEAT || — || align=right | 3.9 km || 
|-id=428 bgcolor=#fefefe
| 363428 ||  || — || September 18, 2003 || Palomar || NEAT || — || align=right data-sort-value="0.73" | 730 m || 
|-id=429 bgcolor=#fefefe
| 363429 ||  || — || September 17, 2003 || Kitt Peak || Spacewatch || NYS || align=right data-sort-value="0.71" | 710 m || 
|-id=430 bgcolor=#d6d6d6
| 363430 ||  || — || September 18, 2003 || Socorro || LINEAR || — || align=right | 3.3 km || 
|-id=431 bgcolor=#d6d6d6
| 363431 ||  || — || September 18, 2003 || Socorro || LINEAR || — || align=right | 3.2 km || 
|-id=432 bgcolor=#d6d6d6
| 363432 ||  || — || September 17, 2003 || Anderson Mesa || LONEOS || — || align=right | 4.4 km || 
|-id=433 bgcolor=#fefefe
| 363433 ||  || — || September 17, 2003 || Kitt Peak || Spacewatch || — || align=right data-sort-value="0.99" | 990 m || 
|-id=434 bgcolor=#fefefe
| 363434 ||  || — || September 18, 2003 || Kitt Peak || Spacewatch || — || align=right | 1.2 km || 
|-id=435 bgcolor=#fefefe
| 363435 ||  || — || September 18, 2003 || Kitt Peak || Spacewatch || — || align=right data-sort-value="0.67" | 670 m || 
|-id=436 bgcolor=#fefefe
| 363436 ||  || — || September 17, 2003 || Socorro || LINEAR || — || align=right data-sort-value="0.80" | 800 m || 
|-id=437 bgcolor=#fefefe
| 363437 ||  || — || September 19, 2003 || Socorro || LINEAR || — || align=right | 1.0 km || 
|-id=438 bgcolor=#FA8072
| 363438 ||  || — || September 20, 2003 || Haleakala || NEAT || — || align=right data-sort-value="0.94" | 940 m || 
|-id=439 bgcolor=#d6d6d6
| 363439 ||  || — || September 21, 2003 || Junk Bond || D. Healy || LIX || align=right | 4.4 km || 
|-id=440 bgcolor=#d6d6d6
| 363440 ||  || — || September 16, 2003 || Kitt Peak || Spacewatch || — || align=right | 3.3 km || 
|-id=441 bgcolor=#fefefe
| 363441 ||  || — || September 16, 2003 || Anderson Mesa || LONEOS || FLO || align=right data-sort-value="0.67" | 670 m || 
|-id=442 bgcolor=#d6d6d6
| 363442 ||  || — || March 22, 2001 || Kitt Peak || Spacewatch || — || align=right | 3.7 km || 
|-id=443 bgcolor=#d6d6d6
| 363443 ||  || — || September 16, 2003 || Kitt Peak || Spacewatch || THM || align=right | 2.3 km || 
|-id=444 bgcolor=#d6d6d6
| 363444 ||  || — || September 21, 2003 || Socorro || LINEAR || LIX || align=right | 4.3 km || 
|-id=445 bgcolor=#d6d6d6
| 363445 ||  || — || September 19, 2003 || Palomar || NEAT || — || align=right | 4.1 km || 
|-id=446 bgcolor=#fefefe
| 363446 ||  || — || September 16, 2003 || Kitt Peak || Spacewatch || MAS || align=right data-sort-value="0.70" | 700 m || 
|-id=447 bgcolor=#d6d6d6
| 363447 ||  || — || September 23, 2003 || Haleakala || NEAT || — || align=right | 4.0 km || 
|-id=448 bgcolor=#d6d6d6
| 363448 ||  || — || September 20, 2003 || Kitt Peak || Spacewatch || — || align=right | 3.8 km || 
|-id=449 bgcolor=#fefefe
| 363449 ||  || — || September 19, 2003 || Kitt Peak || Spacewatch || — || align=right | 1.0 km || 
|-id=450 bgcolor=#fefefe
| 363450 ||  || — || September 18, 2003 || Socorro || LINEAR || MAS || align=right data-sort-value="0.93" | 930 m || 
|-id=451 bgcolor=#fefefe
| 363451 ||  || — || September 18, 2003 || Socorro || LINEAR || NYS || align=right data-sort-value="0.81" | 810 m || 
|-id=452 bgcolor=#fefefe
| 363452 ||  || — || September 18, 2003 || Kitt Peak || Spacewatch || — || align=right data-sort-value="0.68" | 680 m || 
|-id=453 bgcolor=#fefefe
| 363453 ||  || — || September 19, 2003 || Palomar || NEAT || — || align=right | 1.0 km || 
|-id=454 bgcolor=#fefefe
| 363454 ||  || — || September 19, 2003 || Kitt Peak || Spacewatch || — || align=right | 1.1 km || 
|-id=455 bgcolor=#d6d6d6
| 363455 ||  || — || September 24, 2003 || Haleakala || NEAT || LIX || align=right | 4.2 km || 
|-id=456 bgcolor=#d6d6d6
| 363456 ||  || — || September 19, 2003 || Palomar || NEAT || — || align=right | 3.3 km || 
|-id=457 bgcolor=#fefefe
| 363457 ||  || — || September 26, 2003 || Junk Bond || Junk Bond Obs. || — || align=right data-sort-value="0.62" | 620 m || 
|-id=458 bgcolor=#fefefe
| 363458 ||  || — || September 27, 2003 || Desert Eagle || W. K. Y. Yeung || FLO || align=right data-sort-value="0.66" | 660 m || 
|-id=459 bgcolor=#fefefe
| 363459 ||  || — || September 27, 2003 || Socorro || LINEAR || — || align=right data-sort-value="0.89" | 890 m || 
|-id=460 bgcolor=#fefefe
| 363460 ||  || — || September 26, 2003 || Socorro || LINEAR || FLO || align=right data-sort-value="0.74" | 740 m || 
|-id=461 bgcolor=#d6d6d6
| 363461 ||  || — || September 27, 2003 || Socorro || LINEAR || HYG || align=right | 2.8 km || 
|-id=462 bgcolor=#d6d6d6
| 363462 ||  || — || September 29, 2003 || Kitt Peak || Spacewatch || THM || align=right | 2.6 km || 
|-id=463 bgcolor=#d6d6d6
| 363463 ||  || — || September 28, 2003 || Kitt Peak || Spacewatch || — || align=right | 2.8 km || 
|-id=464 bgcolor=#d6d6d6
| 363464 ||  || — || September 27, 2003 || Socorro || LINEAR || — || align=right | 3.2 km || 
|-id=465 bgcolor=#d6d6d6
| 363465 ||  || — || September 27, 2003 || Socorro || LINEAR || Tj (2.92) || align=right | 3.7 km || 
|-id=466 bgcolor=#d6d6d6
| 363466 ||  || — || September 24, 2003 || Haleakala || NEAT || — || align=right | 3.2 km || 
|-id=467 bgcolor=#fefefe
| 363467 ||  || — || August 5, 2003 || Socorro || LINEAR || FLO || align=right data-sort-value="0.72" | 720 m || 
|-id=468 bgcolor=#fefefe
| 363468 ||  || — || September 27, 2003 || Kitt Peak || Spacewatch || — || align=right data-sort-value="0.87" | 870 m || 
|-id=469 bgcolor=#fefefe
| 363469 ||  || — || September 29, 2003 || Kitt Peak || Spacewatch || NYS || align=right data-sort-value="0.51" | 510 m || 
|-id=470 bgcolor=#fefefe
| 363470 ||  || — || September 29, 2003 || Kitt Peak || Spacewatch || NYS || align=right data-sort-value="0.59" | 590 m || 
|-id=471 bgcolor=#d6d6d6
| 363471 ||  || — || September 20, 2003 || Socorro || LINEAR || — || align=right | 3.6 km || 
|-id=472 bgcolor=#d6d6d6
| 363472 ||  || — || September 20, 2003 || Socorro || LINEAR || — || align=right | 4.7 km || 
|-id=473 bgcolor=#fefefe
| 363473 ||  || — || September 20, 2003 || Socorro || LINEAR || — || align=right data-sort-value="0.87" | 870 m || 
|-id=474 bgcolor=#fefefe
| 363474 ||  || — || September 20, 2003 || Kitt Peak || Spacewatch || — || align=right data-sort-value="0.75" | 750 m || 
|-id=475 bgcolor=#fefefe
| 363475 ||  || — || September 20, 2003 || Kitt Peak || Spacewatch || — || align=right data-sort-value="0.88" | 880 m || 
|-id=476 bgcolor=#fefefe
| 363476 ||  || — || September 28, 2003 || Anderson Mesa || LONEOS || — || align=right data-sort-value="0.79" | 790 m || 
|-id=477 bgcolor=#fefefe
| 363477 ||  || — || September 18, 2003 || Haleakala || NEAT || H || align=right data-sort-value="0.58" | 580 m || 
|-id=478 bgcolor=#fefefe
| 363478 ||  || — || September 30, 2003 || Socorro || LINEAR || V || align=right data-sort-value="0.62" | 620 m || 
|-id=479 bgcolor=#fefefe
| 363479 ||  || — || September 29, 2003 || Anderson Mesa || LONEOS || PHO || align=right data-sort-value="0.92" | 920 m || 
|-id=480 bgcolor=#d6d6d6
| 363480 ||  || — || September 17, 2003 || Kitt Peak || Spacewatch || HYG || align=right | 2.6 km || 
|-id=481 bgcolor=#d6d6d6
| 363481 ||  || — || September 26, 2003 || Apache Point || SDSS || LIX || align=right | 4.7 km || 
|-id=482 bgcolor=#d6d6d6
| 363482 ||  || — || September 27, 2003 || Kitt Peak || Spacewatch || — || align=right | 2.6 km || 
|-id=483 bgcolor=#fefefe
| 363483 ||  || — || September 18, 2003 || Kitt Peak || Spacewatch || CLA || align=right | 1.6 km || 
|-id=484 bgcolor=#d6d6d6
| 363484 ||  || — || September 18, 2003 || Kitt Peak || Spacewatch || VER || align=right | 4.3 km || 
|-id=485 bgcolor=#d6d6d6
| 363485 ||  || — || September 21, 2003 || Kitt Peak || Spacewatch || HYG || align=right | 2.8 km || 
|-id=486 bgcolor=#E9E9E9
| 363486 ||  || — || September 26, 2003 || Apache Point || SDSS || — || align=right | 1.3 km || 
|-id=487 bgcolor=#fefefe
| 363487 ||  || — || September 26, 2003 || Apache Point || SDSS || ERI || align=right | 1.6 km || 
|-id=488 bgcolor=#d6d6d6
| 363488 ||  || — || September 26, 2003 || Apache Point || SDSS || — || align=right | 3.1 km || 
|-id=489 bgcolor=#d6d6d6
| 363489 ||  || — || September 19, 2003 || Kitt Peak || Spacewatch || — || align=right | 3.4 km || 
|-id=490 bgcolor=#d6d6d6
| 363490 ||  || — || September 17, 2003 || Kitt Peak || Spacewatch || — || align=right | 2.8 km || 
|-id=491 bgcolor=#FA8072
| 363491 ||  || — || October 3, 2003 || Kitt Peak || Spacewatch || — || align=right data-sort-value="0.77" | 770 m || 
|-id=492 bgcolor=#d6d6d6
| 363492 ||  || — || October 1, 2003 || Anderson Mesa || LONEOS || TIR || align=right | 4.1 km || 
|-id=493 bgcolor=#fefefe
| 363493 ||  || — || October 14, 2003 || Anderson Mesa || LONEOS || — || align=right data-sort-value="0.88" | 880 m || 
|-id=494 bgcolor=#d6d6d6
| 363494 ||  || — || October 14, 2003 || Anderson Mesa || LONEOS || — || align=right | 2.9 km || 
|-id=495 bgcolor=#d6d6d6
| 363495 ||  || — || October 1, 2003 || Kitt Peak || Spacewatch || THB || align=right | 3.4 km || 
|-id=496 bgcolor=#d6d6d6
| 363496 ||  || — || October 2, 2003 || Kitt Peak || Spacewatch || — || align=right | 2.8 km || 
|-id=497 bgcolor=#d6d6d6
| 363497 ||  || — || October 3, 2003 || Kitt Peak || Spacewatch || SYL7:4 || align=right | 3.8 km || 
|-id=498 bgcolor=#d6d6d6
| 363498 ||  || — || October 5, 2003 || Kitt Peak || Spacewatch || — || align=right | 4.4 km || 
|-id=499 bgcolor=#fefefe
| 363499 ||  || — || October 15, 2003 || Anderson Mesa || LONEOS || — || align=right data-sort-value="0.95" | 950 m || 
|-id=500 bgcolor=#fefefe
| 363500 ||  || — || October 17, 2003 || Kitt Peak || Spacewatch || H || align=right data-sort-value="0.87" | 870 m || 
|}

363501–363600 

|-bgcolor=#d6d6d6
| 363501 ||  || — || October 18, 2003 || Palomar || NEAT || EUP || align=right | 4.3 km || 
|-id=502 bgcolor=#fefefe
| 363502 ||  || — || October 21, 2003 || Socorro || LINEAR || H || align=right data-sort-value="0.71" | 710 m || 
|-id=503 bgcolor=#fefefe
| 363503 ||  || — || October 16, 2003 || Anderson Mesa || LONEOS || V || align=right data-sort-value="0.96" | 960 m || 
|-id=504 bgcolor=#fefefe
| 363504 Belleau ||  ||  || October 18, 2003 || Saint-Sulpice || Saint-Sulpice Obs. || V || align=right data-sort-value="0.65" | 650 m || 
|-id=505 bgcolor=#FFC2E0
| 363505 ||  || — || October 21, 2003 || Socorro || LINEAR || ATEPHA || align=right | 1.9 km || 
|-id=506 bgcolor=#d6d6d6
| 363506 ||  || — || October 16, 2003 || Črni Vrh || Črni Vrh || — || align=right | 6.7 km || 
|-id=507 bgcolor=#fefefe
| 363507 ||  || — || October 21, 2003 || Goodricke-Pigott || R. A. Tucker || H || align=right | 1.1 km || 
|-id=508 bgcolor=#d6d6d6
| 363508 ||  || — || October 16, 2003 || Kitt Peak || Spacewatch || — || align=right | 5.1 km || 
|-id=509 bgcolor=#d6d6d6
| 363509 ||  || — || October 19, 2003 || Goodricke-Pigott || R. A. Tucker || — || align=right | 2.6 km || 
|-id=510 bgcolor=#E9E9E9
| 363510 ||  || — || October 16, 2003 || Anderson Mesa || LONEOS || — || align=right | 1.3 km || 
|-id=511 bgcolor=#d6d6d6
| 363511 ||  || — || October 16, 2003 || Anderson Mesa || LONEOS || THB || align=right | 3.7 km || 
|-id=512 bgcolor=#d6d6d6
| 363512 ||  || — || October 16, 2003 || Kitt Peak || Spacewatch || LIX || align=right | 3.7 km || 
|-id=513 bgcolor=#fefefe
| 363513 ||  || — || October 20, 2003 || Palomar || NEAT || H || align=right data-sort-value="0.87" | 870 m || 
|-id=514 bgcolor=#fefefe
| 363514 ||  || — || September 21, 2003 || Campo Imperatore || CINEOS || MAS || align=right data-sort-value="0.77" | 770 m || 
|-id=515 bgcolor=#d6d6d6
| 363515 ||  || — || October 18, 2003 || Palomar || NEAT || — || align=right | 4.5 km || 
|-id=516 bgcolor=#d6d6d6
| 363516 ||  || — || October 20, 2003 || Palomar || NEAT || — || align=right | 3.8 km || 
|-id=517 bgcolor=#fefefe
| 363517 ||  || — || September 22, 2003 || Kitt Peak || Spacewatch || — || align=right data-sort-value="0.90" | 900 m || 
|-id=518 bgcolor=#E9E9E9
| 363518 ||  || — || October 16, 2003 || Anderson Mesa || LONEOS || BRU || align=right | 2.4 km || 
|-id=519 bgcolor=#fefefe
| 363519 ||  || — || October 21, 2003 || Socorro || LINEAR || — || align=right data-sort-value="0.93" | 930 m || 
|-id=520 bgcolor=#fefefe
| 363520 ||  || — || October 22, 2003 || Kitt Peak || Spacewatch || MAS || align=right data-sort-value="0.86" | 860 m || 
|-id=521 bgcolor=#d6d6d6
| 363521 ||  || — || October 21, 2003 || Palomar || NEAT || EUP || align=right | 3.2 km || 
|-id=522 bgcolor=#fefefe
| 363522 ||  || — || October 22, 2003 || Socorro || LINEAR || — || align=right | 1.1 km || 
|-id=523 bgcolor=#fefefe
| 363523 ||  || — || October 21, 2003 || Socorro || LINEAR || — || align=right | 1.1 km || 
|-id=524 bgcolor=#fefefe
| 363524 ||  || — || October 21, 2003 || Socorro || LINEAR || NYS || align=right data-sort-value="0.77" | 770 m || 
|-id=525 bgcolor=#fefefe
| 363525 ||  || — || October 23, 2003 || Kitt Peak || Spacewatch || V || align=right data-sort-value="0.86" | 860 m || 
|-id=526 bgcolor=#d6d6d6
| 363526 ||  || — || October 22, 2003 || Kitt Peak || Spacewatch || — || align=right | 2.9 km || 
|-id=527 bgcolor=#fefefe
| 363527 ||  || — || October 23, 2003 || Kitt Peak || Spacewatch || ERI || align=right | 1.9 km || 
|-id=528 bgcolor=#d6d6d6
| 363528 ||  || — || October 24, 2003 || Kitt Peak || Spacewatch || MEL || align=right | 3.4 km || 
|-id=529 bgcolor=#fefefe
| 363529 ||  || — || October 19, 2003 || Kitt Peak || Spacewatch || — || align=right data-sort-value="0.97" | 970 m || 
|-id=530 bgcolor=#fefefe
| 363530 ||  || — || October 25, 2003 || Kitt Peak || Spacewatch || — || align=right data-sort-value="0.88" | 880 m || 
|-id=531 bgcolor=#fefefe
| 363531 ||  || — || October 26, 2003 || Haleakala || NEAT || NYS || align=right data-sort-value="0.73" | 730 m || 
|-id=532 bgcolor=#d6d6d6
| 363532 ||  || — || October 30, 2003 || Socorro || LINEAR || EUP || align=right | 5.6 km || 
|-id=533 bgcolor=#fefefe
| 363533 ||  || — || October 21, 2003 || Palomar || NEAT || NYS || align=right data-sort-value="0.75" | 750 m || 
|-id=534 bgcolor=#fefefe
| 363534 ||  || — || October 20, 2003 || Palomar || NEAT || NYS || align=right data-sort-value="0.78" | 780 m || 
|-id=535 bgcolor=#d6d6d6
| 363535 ||  || — || October 17, 2003 || Kitt Peak || Spacewatch || EOS || align=right | 2.0 km || 
|-id=536 bgcolor=#E9E9E9
| 363536 ||  || — || October 27, 2003 || Kitt Peak || Spacewatch || — || align=right | 1.1 km || 
|-id=537 bgcolor=#fefefe
| 363537 ||  || — || October 20, 2003 || Palomar || NEAT || V || align=right data-sort-value="0.80" | 800 m || 
|-id=538 bgcolor=#d6d6d6
| 363538 ||  || — || October 17, 2003 || Apache Point || SDSS || — || align=right | 2.5 km || 
|-id=539 bgcolor=#fefefe
| 363539 ||  || — || September 22, 2003 || Kitt Peak || Spacewatch || V || align=right data-sort-value="0.49" | 490 m || 
|-id=540 bgcolor=#d6d6d6
| 363540 ||  || — || September 20, 2003 || Kitt Peak || Spacewatch || — || align=right | 5.5 km || 
|-id=541 bgcolor=#d6d6d6
| 363541 ||  || — || October 19, 2003 || Apache Point || SDSS || — || align=right | 4.2 km || 
|-id=542 bgcolor=#fefefe
| 363542 ||  || — || October 22, 2003 || Kitt Peak || Spacewatch || V || align=right data-sort-value="0.59" | 590 m || 
|-id=543 bgcolor=#fefefe
| 363543 ||  || — || October 22, 2003 || Apache Point || SDSS || V || align=right data-sort-value="0.62" | 620 m || 
|-id=544 bgcolor=#fefefe
| 363544 ||  || — || November 4, 2003 || Socorro || LINEAR || H || align=right data-sort-value="0.85" | 850 m || 
|-id=545 bgcolor=#fefefe
| 363545 ||  || — || November 14, 2003 || Palomar || NEAT || H || align=right | 1.1 km || 
|-id=546 bgcolor=#fefefe
| 363546 ||  || — || November 16, 2003 || Catalina || CSS || V || align=right data-sort-value="0.91" | 910 m || 
|-id=547 bgcolor=#fefefe
| 363547 ||  || — || November 18, 2003 || Palomar || NEAT || — || align=right | 1.0 km || 
|-id=548 bgcolor=#FA8072
| 363548 ||  || — || November 19, 2003 || Kitt Peak || Spacewatch || — || align=right data-sort-value="0.93" | 930 m || 
|-id=549 bgcolor=#fefefe
| 363549 ||  || — || November 20, 2003 || Socorro || LINEAR || H || align=right data-sort-value="0.66" | 660 m || 
|-id=550 bgcolor=#d6d6d6
| 363550 ||  || — || November 19, 2003 || Socorro || LINEAR || — || align=right | 4.4 km || 
|-id=551 bgcolor=#d6d6d6
| 363551 ||  || — || November 19, 2003 || Kitt Peak || Spacewatch || — || align=right | 2.8 km || 
|-id=552 bgcolor=#fefefe
| 363552 ||  || — || November 19, 2003 || Socorro || LINEAR || — || align=right data-sort-value="0.92" | 920 m || 
|-id=553 bgcolor=#d6d6d6
| 363553 ||  || — || November 20, 2003 || Socorro || LINEAR || — || align=right | 3.5 km || 
|-id=554 bgcolor=#d6d6d6
| 363554 ||  || — || November 19, 2003 || Palomar || NEAT || — || align=right | 4.4 km || 
|-id=555 bgcolor=#d6d6d6
| 363555 ||  || — || November 21, 2003 || Kitt Peak || Spacewatch || 7:4 || align=right | 4.7 km || 
|-id=556 bgcolor=#E9E9E9
| 363556 ||  || — || November 21, 2003 || Socorro || LINEAR || — || align=right | 1.3 km || 
|-id=557 bgcolor=#d6d6d6
| 363557 ||  || — || November 21, 2003 || Socorro || LINEAR || Tj (2.99) || align=right | 4.4 km || 
|-id=558 bgcolor=#fefefe
| 363558 ||  || — || October 25, 2003 || Socorro || LINEAR || H || align=right data-sort-value="0.55" | 550 m || 
|-id=559 bgcolor=#fefefe
| 363559 ||  || — || November 24, 2003 || Anderson Mesa || LONEOS || — || align=right data-sort-value="0.96" | 960 m || 
|-id=560 bgcolor=#FA8072
| 363560 ||  || — || December 16, 2003 || Socorro || LINEAR || — || align=right | 1.3 km || 
|-id=561 bgcolor=#fefefe
| 363561 ||  || — || December 17, 2003 || Socorro || LINEAR || H || align=right data-sort-value="0.61" | 610 m || 
|-id=562 bgcolor=#E9E9E9
| 363562 ||  || — || December 17, 2003 || Anderson Mesa || LONEOS || — || align=right | 1.5 km || 
|-id=563 bgcolor=#fefefe
| 363563 ||  || — || November 19, 2003 || Socorro || LINEAR || — || align=right | 1.3 km || 
|-id=564 bgcolor=#E9E9E9
| 363564 ||  || — || December 27, 2003 || Socorro || LINEAR || — || align=right | 1.1 km || 
|-id=565 bgcolor=#E9E9E9
| 363565 ||  || — || December 30, 2003 || Socorro || LINEAR || — || align=right | 1.4 km || 
|-id=566 bgcolor=#E9E9E9
| 363566 ||  || — || December 17, 2003 || Kitt Peak || Spacewatch || EUN || align=right | 1.5 km || 
|-id=567 bgcolor=#d6d6d6
| 363567 ||  || — || January 13, 2004 || Palomar || NEAT || — || align=right | 3.4 km || 
|-id=568 bgcolor=#E9E9E9
| 363568 ||  || — || January 14, 2004 || Palomar || NEAT || — || align=right | 3.2 km || 
|-id=569 bgcolor=#fefefe
| 363569 ||  || — || January 13, 2004 || Anderson Mesa || LONEOS || H || align=right data-sort-value="0.84" | 840 m || 
|-id=570 bgcolor=#E9E9E9
| 363570 ||  || — || January 14, 2004 || Palomar || NEAT || ADE || align=right | 2.9 km || 
|-id=571 bgcolor=#E9E9E9
| 363571 ||  || — || January 15, 2004 || Kitt Peak || Spacewatch || — || align=right data-sort-value="0.98" | 980 m || 
|-id=572 bgcolor=#d6d6d6
| 363572 ||  || — || January 17, 2004 || Haleakala || NEAT || — || align=right | 4.6 km || 
|-id=573 bgcolor=#E9E9E9
| 363573 ||  || — || January 17, 2004 || Palomar || NEAT || — || align=right | 1.4 km || 
|-id=574 bgcolor=#E9E9E9
| 363574 ||  || — || January 16, 2004 || Palomar || NEAT || — || align=right | 1.5 km || 
|-id=575 bgcolor=#E9E9E9
| 363575 ||  || — || January 18, 2004 || Palomar || NEAT || — || align=right | 1.0 km || 
|-id=576 bgcolor=#E9E9E9
| 363576 ||  || — || January 24, 2004 || Socorro || LINEAR || — || align=right | 1.7 km || 
|-id=577 bgcolor=#E9E9E9
| 363577 ||  || — || January 24, 2004 || Socorro || LINEAR || — || align=right | 1.3 km || 
|-id=578 bgcolor=#E9E9E9
| 363578 ||  || — || January 27, 2004 || Socorro || LINEAR || — || align=right | 2.8 km || 
|-id=579 bgcolor=#fefefe
| 363579 ||  || — || January 28, 2004 || Haleakala || NEAT || — || align=right data-sort-value="0.88" | 880 m || 
|-id=580 bgcolor=#E9E9E9
| 363580 ||  || — || January 20, 2004 || Cerro Paranal || Paranal Obs. || — || align=right | 1.4 km || 
|-id=581 bgcolor=#E9E9E9
| 363581 ||  || — || February 11, 2004 || Desert Eagle || W. K. Y. Yeung || — || align=right | 1.3 km || 
|-id=582 bgcolor=#E9E9E9
| 363582 Folpotat ||  ||  || February 9, 2004 || Vicques || M. Ory || — || align=right | 1.4 km || 
|-id=583 bgcolor=#E9E9E9
| 363583 ||  || — || January 30, 2004 || Kitt Peak || Spacewatch || — || align=right | 1.4 km || 
|-id=584 bgcolor=#E9E9E9
| 363584 ||  || — || February 11, 2004 || Palomar || NEAT || — || align=right | 3.8 km || 
|-id=585 bgcolor=#E9E9E9
| 363585 ||  || — || February 11, 2004 || Palomar || NEAT || BAR || align=right | 1.4 km || 
|-id=586 bgcolor=#E9E9E9
| 363586 ||  || — || February 13, 2004 || Kitt Peak || Spacewatch || — || align=right | 1.1 km || 
|-id=587 bgcolor=#E9E9E9
| 363587 ||  || — || February 11, 2004 || Palomar || NEAT || EUN || align=right | 1.7 km || 
|-id=588 bgcolor=#E9E9E9
| 363588 ||  || — || February 11, 2004 || Palomar || NEAT || — || align=right | 1.6 km || 
|-id=589 bgcolor=#E9E9E9
| 363589 ||  || — || February 14, 2004 || Catalina || CSS || JUN || align=right | 1.1 km || 
|-id=590 bgcolor=#E9E9E9
| 363590 ||  || — || January 17, 2004 || Haleakala || NEAT || — || align=right | 1.9 km || 
|-id=591 bgcolor=#E9E9E9
| 363591 ||  || — || February 17, 2004 || Kitt Peak || Spacewatch || HNS || align=right | 1.6 km || 
|-id=592 bgcolor=#E9E9E9
| 363592 ||  || — || February 14, 2004 || Kitt Peak || Spacewatch || — || align=right | 1.6 km || 
|-id=593 bgcolor=#E9E9E9
| 363593 ||  || — || February 22, 2004 || Kitt Peak || Spacewatch || — || align=right | 1.4 km || 
|-id=594 bgcolor=#E9E9E9
| 363594 ||  || — || March 13, 2004 || Palomar || NEAT || — || align=right | 2.2 km || 
|-id=595 bgcolor=#E9E9E9
| 363595 ||  || — || March 14, 2004 || Socorro || LINEAR || — || align=right | 2.0 km || 
|-id=596 bgcolor=#E9E9E9
| 363596 ||  || — || March 15, 2004 || Kitt Peak || Spacewatch || MIS || align=right | 2.7 km || 
|-id=597 bgcolor=#E9E9E9
| 363597 ||  || — || March 15, 2004 || Catalina || CSS || — || align=right | 1.5 km || 
|-id=598 bgcolor=#E9E9E9
| 363598 ||  || — || March 15, 2004 || Socorro || LINEAR || RAF || align=right | 1.1 km || 
|-id=599 bgcolor=#FFC2E0
| 363599 ||  || — || March 23, 2004 || Socorro || LINEAR || APOPHAmoon || align=right data-sort-value="0.15" | 150 m || 
|-id=600 bgcolor=#E9E9E9
| 363600 ||  || — || March 19, 2004 || Socorro || LINEAR || JUN || align=right data-sort-value="0.99" | 990 m || 
|}

363601–363700 

|-bgcolor=#E9E9E9
| 363601 ||  || — || March 19, 2004 || Palomar || NEAT || EUN || align=right | 1.4 km || 
|-id=602 bgcolor=#E9E9E9
| 363602 ||  || — || March 21, 2004 || Kitt Peak || Spacewatch || — || align=right | 1.6 km || 
|-id=603 bgcolor=#E9E9E9
| 363603 ||  || — || March 27, 2004 || Socorro || LINEAR || JUN || align=right | 1.0 km || 
|-id=604 bgcolor=#E9E9E9
| 363604 ||  || — || March 26, 2004 || Anderson Mesa || LONEOS || — || align=right | 1.7 km || 
|-id=605 bgcolor=#E9E9E9
| 363605 ||  || — || March 26, 2004 || Catalina || CSS || JUN || align=right | 1.1 km || 
|-id=606 bgcolor=#E9E9E9
| 363606 ||  || — || March 28, 2004 || Socorro || LINEAR || — || align=right | 1.8 km || 
|-id=607 bgcolor=#E9E9E9
| 363607 ||  || — || March 25, 2004 || Anderson Mesa || LONEOS || — || align=right | 2.0 km || 
|-id=608 bgcolor=#E9E9E9
| 363608 ||  || — || March 31, 2004 || Socorro || LINEAR || — || align=right | 2.3 km || 
|-id=609 bgcolor=#E9E9E9
| 363609 ||  || — || April 12, 2004 || Socorro || LINEAR || — || align=right | 3.9 km || 
|-id=610 bgcolor=#E9E9E9
| 363610 ||  || — || April 19, 2004 || Socorro || LINEAR || — || align=right | 2.0 km || 
|-id=611 bgcolor=#E9E9E9
| 363611 ||  || — || April 16, 2004 || Kitt Peak || Spacewatch || NEM || align=right | 2.2 km || 
|-id=612 bgcolor=#E9E9E9
| 363612 ||  || — || April 21, 2004 || Catalina || CSS || — || align=right | 2.0 km || 
|-id=613 bgcolor=#E9E9E9
| 363613 ||  || — || April 23, 2004 || Kitt Peak || Spacewatch || — || align=right | 3.1 km || 
|-id=614 bgcolor=#E9E9E9
| 363614 ||  || — || April 22, 2004 || Hunters Hill || Hunters Hill Obs. || JUN || align=right | 1.1 km || 
|-id=615 bgcolor=#E9E9E9
| 363615 ||  || — || April 25, 2004 || Kitt Peak || Spacewatch || — || align=right | 2.4 km || 
|-id=616 bgcolor=#E9E9E9
| 363616 ||  || — || May 9, 2004 || Kitt Peak || Spacewatch || AGN || align=right | 1.2 km || 
|-id=617 bgcolor=#FFC2E0
| 363617 ||  || — || May 30, 2004 || Socorro || LINEAR || APO || align=right data-sort-value="0.74" | 740 m || 
|-id=618 bgcolor=#E9E9E9
| 363618 ||  || — || June 13, 2004 || Bergisch Gladbac || W. Bickel || — || align=right | 2.0 km || 
|-id=619 bgcolor=#E9E9E9
| 363619 ||  || — || July 22, 2004 || Hormersdorf || Hormersdorf Obs. || TIN || align=right | 1.3 km || 
|-id=620 bgcolor=#E9E9E9
| 363620 ||  || — || August 6, 2004 || Palomar || NEAT || — || align=right | 2.2 km || 
|-id=621 bgcolor=#d6d6d6
| 363621 ||  || — || August 9, 2004 || Socorro || LINEAR || — || align=right | 3.4 km || 
|-id=622 bgcolor=#E9E9E9
| 363622 ||  || — || August 11, 2004 || Socorro || LINEAR || — || align=right | 3.4 km || 
|-id=623 bgcolor=#d6d6d6
| 363623 Chelčický ||  ||  || August 15, 2004 || Kleť || KLENOT || — || align=right | 3.0 km || 
|-id=624 bgcolor=#d6d6d6
| 363624 ||  || — || August 20, 2004 || Mauna Kea || Mauna Kea Obs. || — || align=right | 3.0 km || 
|-id=625 bgcolor=#d6d6d6
| 363625 ||  || — || September 5, 2004 || Socorro || LINEAR || — || align=right | 4.3 km || 
|-id=626 bgcolor=#FFC2E0
| 363626 ||  || — || September 8, 2004 || Socorro || LINEAR || AMO || align=right data-sort-value="0.63" | 630 m || 
|-id=627 bgcolor=#d6d6d6
| 363627 ||  || — || September 7, 2004 || Socorro || LINEAR || — || align=right | 3.2 km || 
|-id=628 bgcolor=#E9E9E9
| 363628 ||  || — || September 7, 2004 || Palomar || NEAT || — || align=right | 2.5 km || 
|-id=629 bgcolor=#E9E9E9
| 363629 ||  || — || September 8, 2004 || Palomar || NEAT || DOR || align=right | 3.2 km || 
|-id=630 bgcolor=#FA8072
| 363630 ||  || — || September 8, 2004 || Socorro || LINEAR || — || align=right data-sort-value="0.59" | 590 m || 
|-id=631 bgcolor=#d6d6d6
| 363631 ||  || — || September 9, 2004 || Socorro || LINEAR || — || align=right | 3.7 km || 
|-id=632 bgcolor=#d6d6d6
| 363632 ||  || — || September 9, 2004 || Kitt Peak || Spacewatch || EOS || align=right | 1.5 km || 
|-id=633 bgcolor=#E9E9E9
| 363633 ||  || — || September 7, 2004 || Socorro || LINEAR || — || align=right | 3.2 km || 
|-id=634 bgcolor=#E9E9E9
| 363634 ||  || — || September 7, 2004 || Palomar || NEAT || — || align=right | 3.3 km || 
|-id=635 bgcolor=#d6d6d6
| 363635 ||  || — || September 10, 2004 || Socorro || LINEAR || EOS || align=right | 2.5 km || 
|-id=636 bgcolor=#fefefe
| 363636 ||  || — || September 10, 2004 || Socorro || LINEAR || — || align=right data-sort-value="0.73" | 730 m || 
|-id=637 bgcolor=#d6d6d6
| 363637 ||  || — || September 10, 2004 || Socorro || LINEAR || — || align=right | 2.6 km || 
|-id=638 bgcolor=#d6d6d6
| 363638 ||  || — || September 10, 2004 || Socorro || LINEAR || — || align=right | 3.5 km || 
|-id=639 bgcolor=#d6d6d6
| 363639 ||  || — || September 10, 2004 || Socorro || LINEAR || — || align=right | 3.6 km || 
|-id=640 bgcolor=#d6d6d6
| 363640 ||  || — || September 10, 2004 || Socorro || LINEAR || — || align=right | 4.9 km || 
|-id=641 bgcolor=#d6d6d6
| 363641 ||  || — || September 11, 2004 || Kitt Peak || Spacewatch || HYG || align=right | 2.1 km || 
|-id=642 bgcolor=#d6d6d6
| 363642 ||  || — || September 11, 2004 || Socorro || LINEAR || — || align=right | 3.3 km || 
|-id=643 bgcolor=#fefefe
| 363643 ||  || — || September 11, 2004 || Socorro || LINEAR || — || align=right | 1.4 km || 
|-id=644 bgcolor=#E9E9E9
| 363644 ||  || — || September 11, 2004 || Socorro || LINEAR || — || align=right | 3.2 km || 
|-id=645 bgcolor=#d6d6d6
| 363645 ||  || — || September 9, 2004 || Kitt Peak || Spacewatch || — || align=right | 2.4 km || 
|-id=646 bgcolor=#d6d6d6
| 363646 ||  || — || September 9, 2004 || Kitt Peak || Spacewatch || — || align=right | 3.5 km || 
|-id=647 bgcolor=#d6d6d6
| 363647 ||  || — || September 10, 2004 || Kitt Peak || Spacewatch || — || align=right | 3.3 km || 
|-id=648 bgcolor=#d6d6d6
| 363648 ||  || — || September 14, 2004 || Socorro || LINEAR || — || align=right | 4.4 km || 
|-id=649 bgcolor=#d6d6d6
| 363649 ||  || — || September 6, 2004 || Palomar || NEAT || — || align=right | 4.2 km || 
|-id=650 bgcolor=#d6d6d6
| 363650 ||  || — || September 6, 2004 || Palomar || NEAT || — || align=right | 2.9 km || 
|-id=651 bgcolor=#d6d6d6
| 363651 ||  || — || September 11, 2004 || Socorro || LINEAR || — || align=right | 3.1 km || 
|-id=652 bgcolor=#fefefe
| 363652 ||  || — || September 13, 2004 || Socorro || LINEAR || FLO || align=right data-sort-value="0.66" | 660 m || 
|-id=653 bgcolor=#d6d6d6
| 363653 ||  || — || September 13, 2004 || Socorro || LINEAR || — || align=right | 5.2 km || 
|-id=654 bgcolor=#d6d6d6
| 363654 ||  || — || September 15, 2004 || Kitt Peak || Spacewatch || — || align=right | 2.9 km || 
|-id=655 bgcolor=#fefefe
| 363655 ||  || — || September 15, 2004 || Kitt Peak || Spacewatch || — || align=right data-sort-value="0.91" | 910 m || 
|-id=656 bgcolor=#fefefe
| 363656 ||  || — || September 8, 2004 || Socorro || LINEAR || — || align=right data-sort-value="0.91" | 910 m || 
|-id=657 bgcolor=#d6d6d6
| 363657 ||  || — || September 18, 2004 || Socorro || LINEAR || EUP || align=right | 3.8 km || 
|-id=658 bgcolor=#d6d6d6
| 363658 ||  || — || September 18, 2004 || Socorro || LINEAR || — || align=right | 4.7 km || 
|-id=659 bgcolor=#d6d6d6
| 363659 ||  || — || September 18, 2004 || Socorro || LINEAR || — || align=right | 3.4 km || 
|-id=660 bgcolor=#fefefe
| 363660 ||  || — || September 17, 2004 || Socorro || LINEAR || FLO || align=right data-sort-value="0.57" | 570 m || 
|-id=661 bgcolor=#d6d6d6
| 363661 ||  || — || October 5, 2004 || Kitt Peak || Spacewatch || — || align=right | 2.5 km || 
|-id=662 bgcolor=#d6d6d6
| 363662 ||  || — || October 4, 2004 || Kitt Peak || Spacewatch || — || align=right | 3.5 km || 
|-id=663 bgcolor=#d6d6d6
| 363663 ||  || — || October 4, 2004 || Kitt Peak || Spacewatch || — || align=right | 3.0 km || 
|-id=664 bgcolor=#d6d6d6
| 363664 ||  || — || October 4, 2004 || Kitt Peak || Spacewatch || EOS || align=right | 2.5 km || 
|-id=665 bgcolor=#fefefe
| 363665 ||  || — || October 4, 2004 || Kitt Peak || Spacewatch || V || align=right data-sort-value="0.64" | 640 m || 
|-id=666 bgcolor=#d6d6d6
| 363666 ||  || — || October 4, 2004 || Kitt Peak || Spacewatch || EOS || align=right | 2.1 km || 
|-id=667 bgcolor=#d6d6d6
| 363667 ||  || — || October 4, 2004 || Kitt Peak || Spacewatch || EOS || align=right | 2.6 km || 
|-id=668 bgcolor=#d6d6d6
| 363668 ||  || — || October 4, 2004 || Kitt Peak || Spacewatch || — || align=right | 3.6 km || 
|-id=669 bgcolor=#d6d6d6
| 363669 ||  || — || October 5, 2004 || Kitt Peak || Spacewatch || — || align=right | 2.6 km || 
|-id=670 bgcolor=#d6d6d6
| 363670 ||  || — || October 5, 2004 || Kitt Peak || Spacewatch || VER || align=right | 2.6 km || 
|-id=671 bgcolor=#d6d6d6
| 363671 ||  || — || October 5, 2004 || Kitt Peak || Spacewatch || EMA || align=right | 3.9 km || 
|-id=672 bgcolor=#d6d6d6
| 363672 ||  || — || October 5, 2004 || Palomar || NEAT || — || align=right | 2.8 km || 
|-id=673 bgcolor=#fefefe
| 363673 ||  || — || October 5, 2004 || Anderson Mesa || LONEOS || — || align=right data-sort-value="0.76" | 760 m || 
|-id=674 bgcolor=#fefefe
| 363674 ||  || — || October 6, 2004 || Kitt Peak || Spacewatch || — || align=right data-sort-value="0.94" | 940 m || 
|-id=675 bgcolor=#d6d6d6
| 363675 ||  || — || October 5, 2004 || Kitt Peak || Spacewatch || — || align=right | 3.3 km || 
|-id=676 bgcolor=#d6d6d6
| 363676 ||  || — || October 5, 2004 || Kitt Peak || Spacewatch || — || align=right | 2.4 km || 
|-id=677 bgcolor=#d6d6d6
| 363677 ||  || — || October 5, 2004 || Kitt Peak || Spacewatch || — || align=right | 2.2 km || 
|-id=678 bgcolor=#d6d6d6
| 363678 ||  || — || October 5, 2004 || Kitt Peak || Spacewatch || EOS || align=right | 2.2 km || 
|-id=679 bgcolor=#d6d6d6
| 363679 ||  || — || October 5, 2004 || Kitt Peak || Spacewatch || — || align=right | 2.2 km || 
|-id=680 bgcolor=#fefefe
| 363680 ||  || — || October 7, 2004 || Socorro || LINEAR || FLO || align=right data-sort-value="0.72" | 720 m || 
|-id=681 bgcolor=#fefefe
| 363681 ||  || — || October 7, 2004 || Socorro || LINEAR || FLO || align=right data-sort-value="0.75" | 750 m || 
|-id=682 bgcolor=#E9E9E9
| 363682 ||  || — || October 7, 2004 || Palomar || NEAT || CLO || align=right | 3.7 km || 
|-id=683 bgcolor=#d6d6d6
| 363683 ||  || — || October 7, 2004 || Anderson Mesa || LONEOS || — || align=right | 3.6 km || 
|-id=684 bgcolor=#fefefe
| 363684 ||  || — || October 7, 2004 || Socorro || LINEAR || FLO || align=right data-sort-value="0.62" | 620 m || 
|-id=685 bgcolor=#d6d6d6
| 363685 ||  || — || October 7, 2004 || Palomar || NEAT || — || align=right | 4.0 km || 
|-id=686 bgcolor=#d6d6d6
| 363686 ||  || — || October 7, 2004 || Palomar || NEAT || — || align=right | 3.9 km || 
|-id=687 bgcolor=#d6d6d6
| 363687 ||  || — || October 4, 2004 || Kitt Peak || Spacewatch || — || align=right | 4.2 km || 
|-id=688 bgcolor=#d6d6d6
| 363688 ||  || — || October 6, 2004 || Kitt Peak || Spacewatch || — || align=right | 3.0 km || 
|-id=689 bgcolor=#d6d6d6
| 363689 ||  || — || October 6, 2004 || Kitt Peak || Spacewatch || — || align=right | 3.2 km || 
|-id=690 bgcolor=#d6d6d6
| 363690 ||  || — || October 6, 2004 || Kitt Peak || Spacewatch || — || align=right | 3.4 km || 
|-id=691 bgcolor=#d6d6d6
| 363691 ||  || — || October 6, 2004 || Kitt Peak || Spacewatch || CRO || align=right | 3.5 km || 
|-id=692 bgcolor=#d6d6d6
| 363692 ||  || — || October 6, 2004 || Kitt Peak || Spacewatch || THM || align=right | 2.9 km || 
|-id=693 bgcolor=#fefefe
| 363693 ||  || — || October 7, 2004 || Kitt Peak || Spacewatch || — || align=right data-sort-value="0.88" | 880 m || 
|-id=694 bgcolor=#d6d6d6
| 363694 ||  || — || October 7, 2004 || Kitt Peak || Spacewatch || — || align=right | 3.5 km || 
|-id=695 bgcolor=#d6d6d6
| 363695 ||  || — || October 8, 2004 || Kitt Peak || Spacewatch || HYG || align=right | 2.7 km || 
|-id=696 bgcolor=#d6d6d6
| 363696 ||  || — || October 9, 2004 || Kitt Peak || Spacewatch || EOS || align=right | 2.5 km || 
|-id=697 bgcolor=#d6d6d6
| 363697 ||  || — || October 9, 2004 || Kitt Peak || Spacewatch || — || align=right | 3.2 km || 
|-id=698 bgcolor=#d6d6d6
| 363698 ||  || — || October 9, 2004 || Kitt Peak || Spacewatch || — || align=right | 3.7 km || 
|-id=699 bgcolor=#d6d6d6
| 363699 ||  || — || October 9, 2004 || Kitt Peak || Spacewatch || — || align=right | 3.2 km || 
|-id=700 bgcolor=#fefefe
| 363700 ||  || — || October 9, 2004 || Kitt Peak || Spacewatch || — || align=right data-sort-value="0.91" | 910 m || 
|}

363701–363800 

|-bgcolor=#d6d6d6
| 363701 ||  || — || October 10, 2004 || Kitt Peak || Spacewatch || EOS || align=right | 1.8 km || 
|-id=702 bgcolor=#d6d6d6
| 363702 ||  || — || October 10, 2004 || Socorro || LINEAR || — || align=right | 3.8 km || 
|-id=703 bgcolor=#fefefe
| 363703 ||  || — || October 11, 2004 || Kitt Peak || Spacewatch || — || align=right data-sort-value="0.66" | 660 m || 
|-id=704 bgcolor=#d6d6d6
| 363704 ||  || — || October 9, 2004 || Kitt Peak || Spacewatch || CRO || align=right | 3.9 km || 
|-id=705 bgcolor=#d6d6d6
| 363705 ||  || — || October 9, 2004 || Kitt Peak || Spacewatch || — || align=right | 4.8 km || 
|-id=706 bgcolor=#d6d6d6
| 363706 Karazija ||  ||  || October 14, 2004 || Moletai || K. Černis, J. Zdanavičius || — || align=right | 3.6 km || 
|-id=707 bgcolor=#d6d6d6
| 363707 ||  || — || October 10, 2004 || Kitt Peak || Spacewatch || — || align=right | 2.4 km || 
|-id=708 bgcolor=#d6d6d6
| 363708 ||  || — || October 14, 2004 || Anderson Mesa || LONEOS || — || align=right | 3.7 km || 
|-id=709 bgcolor=#d6d6d6
| 363709 ||  || — || October 4, 2004 || Palomar || NEAT || MEL || align=right | 4.1 km || 
|-id=710 bgcolor=#fefefe
| 363710 ||  || — || October 10, 2004 || Socorro || LINEAR || V || align=right data-sort-value="0.81" | 810 m || 
|-id=711 bgcolor=#d6d6d6
| 363711 ||  || — || September 25, 2004 || Anderson Mesa || LONEOS || — || align=right | 3.7 km || 
|-id=712 bgcolor=#d6d6d6
| 363712 ||  || — || November 4, 2004 || Kitt Peak || Spacewatch || EUP || align=right | 5.2 km || 
|-id=713 bgcolor=#d6d6d6
| 363713 ||  || — || November 3, 2004 || Kitt Peak || Spacewatch || — || align=right | 3.9 km || 
|-id=714 bgcolor=#FA8072
| 363714 ||  || — || November 4, 2004 || Kitt Peak || Spacewatch || — || align=right data-sort-value="0.60" | 600 m || 
|-id=715 bgcolor=#d6d6d6
| 363715 ||  || — || November 4, 2004 || Catalina || CSS || — || align=right | 4.0 km || 
|-id=716 bgcolor=#d6d6d6
| 363716 ||  || — || November 4, 2004 || Kitt Peak || Spacewatch || — || align=right | 3.6 km || 
|-id=717 bgcolor=#d6d6d6
| 363717 ||  || — || November 3, 2004 || Kitt Peak || Spacewatch || EMA || align=right | 2.9 km || 
|-id=718 bgcolor=#fefefe
| 363718 ||  || — || November 4, 2004 || Kitt Peak || Spacewatch || — || align=right data-sort-value="0.79" | 790 m || 
|-id=719 bgcolor=#d6d6d6
| 363719 ||  || — || November 4, 2004 || Kitt Peak || Spacewatch || — || align=right | 3.7 km || 
|-id=720 bgcolor=#fefefe
| 363720 ||  || — || November 4, 2004 || Catalina || CSS || NYS || align=right data-sort-value="0.72" | 720 m || 
|-id=721 bgcolor=#d6d6d6
| 363721 ||  || — || November 9, 2004 || Catalina || CSS || — || align=right | 3.7 km || 
|-id=722 bgcolor=#fefefe
| 363722 ||  || — || November 9, 2004 || Catalina || CSS || FLO || align=right data-sort-value="0.67" | 670 m || 
|-id=723 bgcolor=#d6d6d6
| 363723 ||  || — || November 11, 2004 || Socorro || LINEAR || ALA || align=right | 3.8 km || 
|-id=724 bgcolor=#d6d6d6
| 363724 ||  || — || November 7, 2004 || Socorro || LINEAR || — || align=right | 3.8 km || 
|-id=725 bgcolor=#d6d6d6
| 363725 ||  || — || October 15, 2004 || Mount Lemmon || Mount Lemmon Survey || HYG || align=right | 3.5 km || 
|-id=726 bgcolor=#d6d6d6
| 363726 ||  || — || November 10, 2004 || Kitt Peak || Spacewatch || — || align=right | 3.7 km || 
|-id=727 bgcolor=#fefefe
| 363727 ||  || — || November 17, 2004 || Campo Imperatore || CINEOS || — || align=right data-sort-value="0.69" | 690 m || 
|-id=728 bgcolor=#fefefe
| 363728 ||  || — || December 4, 2004 || Kleť || Kleť Obs. || — || align=right data-sort-value="0.96" | 960 m || 
|-id=729 bgcolor=#d6d6d6
| 363729 ||  || — || December 3, 2004 || Kitt Peak || Spacewatch || — || align=right | 4.5 km || 
|-id=730 bgcolor=#fefefe
| 363730 ||  || — || December 8, 2004 || Socorro || LINEAR || — || align=right | 1.2 km || 
|-id=731 bgcolor=#d6d6d6
| 363731 ||  || — || December 7, 2004 || Socorro || LINEAR || — || align=right | 3.1 km || 
|-id=732 bgcolor=#fefefe
| 363732 ||  || — || December 9, 2004 || Kitt Peak || Spacewatch || — || align=right data-sort-value="0.84" | 840 m || 
|-id=733 bgcolor=#fefefe
| 363733 ||  || — || December 2, 2004 || Kitt Peak || Spacewatch || — || align=right data-sort-value="0.99" | 990 m || 
|-id=734 bgcolor=#FFC2E0
| 363734 ||  || — || December 14, 2004 || Socorro || LINEAR || APOPHA || align=right data-sort-value="0.62" | 620 m || 
|-id=735 bgcolor=#d6d6d6
| 363735 ||  || — || December 2, 2004 || Kitt Peak || Spacewatch || — || align=right | 4.1 km || 
|-id=736 bgcolor=#fefefe
| 363736 ||  || — || December 3, 2004 || Kitt Peak || Spacewatch || MAS || align=right data-sort-value="0.58" | 580 m || 
|-id=737 bgcolor=#fefefe
| 363737 ||  || — || November 7, 2004 || Socorro || LINEAR || FLO || align=right data-sort-value="0.87" | 870 m || 
|-id=738 bgcolor=#fefefe
| 363738 ||  || — || December 10, 2004 || Socorro || LINEAR || — || align=right data-sort-value="0.83" | 830 m || 
|-id=739 bgcolor=#fefefe
| 363739 ||  || — || December 10, 2004 || Socorro || LINEAR || NYS || align=right data-sort-value="0.86" | 860 m || 
|-id=740 bgcolor=#fefefe
| 363740 ||  || — || December 11, 2004 || Kitt Peak || Spacewatch || — || align=right data-sort-value="0.67" | 670 m || 
|-id=741 bgcolor=#d6d6d6
| 363741 ||  || — || December 11, 2004 || Kitt Peak || Spacewatch || Tj (2.99) || align=right | 5.5 km || 
|-id=742 bgcolor=#fefefe
| 363742 ||  || — || December 11, 2004 || Kitt Peak || Spacewatch || ERI || align=right | 1.4 km || 
|-id=743 bgcolor=#fefefe
| 363743 ||  || — || December 15, 2004 || Socorro || LINEAR || — || align=right data-sort-value="0.95" | 950 m || 
|-id=744 bgcolor=#fefefe
| 363744 ||  || — || December 14, 2004 || Kitt Peak || Spacewatch || — || align=right data-sort-value="0.99" | 990 m || 
|-id=745 bgcolor=#fefefe
| 363745 ||  || — || December 9, 2004 || Kitt Peak || Spacewatch || — || align=right data-sort-value="0.78" | 780 m || 
|-id=746 bgcolor=#d6d6d6
| 363746 ||  || — || December 16, 2004 || Catalina || CSS || Tj (2.88) || align=right | 4.3 km || 
|-id=747 bgcolor=#fefefe
| 363747 ||  || — || December 18, 2004 || Mount Lemmon || Mount Lemmon Survey || — || align=right data-sort-value="0.91" | 910 m || 
|-id=748 bgcolor=#fefefe
| 363748 || 2005 AF || — || January 3, 2005 || Piszkéstető || K. Sárneczky || — || align=right data-sort-value="0.59" | 590 m || 
|-id=749 bgcolor=#fefefe
| 363749 ||  || — || December 11, 2004 || Kitt Peak || Spacewatch || NYS || align=right data-sort-value="0.66" | 660 m || 
|-id=750 bgcolor=#fefefe
| 363750 ||  || — || January 13, 2005 || Socorro || LINEAR || V || align=right data-sort-value="0.81" | 810 m || 
|-id=751 bgcolor=#fefefe
| 363751 ||  || — || January 13, 2005 || Kitt Peak || Spacewatch || — || align=right data-sort-value="0.77" | 770 m || 
|-id=752 bgcolor=#fefefe
| 363752 ||  || — || January 15, 2005 || Kitt Peak || Spacewatch || — || align=right data-sort-value="0.90" | 900 m || 
|-id=753 bgcolor=#fefefe
| 363753 ||  || — || January 13, 2005 || Kitt Peak || Spacewatch || V || align=right data-sort-value="0.69" | 690 m || 
|-id=754 bgcolor=#fefefe
| 363754 ||  || — || January 13, 2005 || Kitt Peak || Spacewatch || NYS || align=right data-sort-value="0.65" | 650 m || 
|-id=755 bgcolor=#fefefe
| 363755 ||  || — || January 17, 2005 || Socorro || LINEAR || — || align=right | 1.1 km || 
|-id=756 bgcolor=#fefefe
| 363756 ||  || — || January 17, 2005 || Socorro || LINEAR || — || align=right | 1.0 km || 
|-id=757 bgcolor=#fefefe
| 363757 ||  || — || February 1, 2005 || Kitt Peak || Spacewatch || NYS || align=right data-sort-value="0.59" | 590 m || 
|-id=758 bgcolor=#E9E9E9
| 363758 ||  || — || February 1, 2005 || Kitt Peak || Spacewatch || — || align=right | 1.1 km || 
|-id=759 bgcolor=#fefefe
| 363759 ||  || — || February 2, 2005 || Socorro || LINEAR || — || align=right data-sort-value="0.71" | 710 m || 
|-id=760 bgcolor=#E9E9E9
| 363760 ||  || — || February 2, 2005 || Catalina || CSS || — || align=right | 1.1 km || 
|-id=761 bgcolor=#fefefe
| 363761 ||  || — || February 6, 2005 || Kleť || Kleť Obs. || NYS || align=right data-sort-value="0.82" | 820 m || 
|-id=762 bgcolor=#fefefe
| 363762 ||  || — || February 4, 2005 || Catalina || CSS || — || align=right | 1.4 km || 
|-id=763 bgcolor=#fefefe
| 363763 ||  || — || March 3, 2005 || Kitt Peak || Spacewatch || — || align=right data-sort-value="0.75" | 750 m || 
|-id=764 bgcolor=#fefefe
| 363764 ||  || — || March 3, 2005 || Catalina || CSS || — || align=right data-sort-value="0.87" | 870 m || 
|-id=765 bgcolor=#fefefe
| 363765 ||  || — || March 3, 2005 || Kitt Peak || Spacewatch || — || align=right | 1.0 km || 
|-id=766 bgcolor=#fefefe
| 363766 ||  || — || March 3, 2005 || Catalina || CSS || — || align=right | 1.1 km || 
|-id=767 bgcolor=#fefefe
| 363767 ||  || — || March 4, 2005 || Socorro || LINEAR || MAS || align=right | 1.1 km || 
|-id=768 bgcolor=#fefefe
| 363768 ||  || — || March 8, 2005 || Mount Lemmon || Mount Lemmon Survey || — || align=right data-sort-value="0.88" | 880 m || 
|-id=769 bgcolor=#fefefe
| 363769 ||  || — || March 8, 2005 || Anderson Mesa || LONEOS || MAS || align=right data-sort-value="0.93" | 930 m || 
|-id=770 bgcolor=#fefefe
| 363770 ||  || — || March 10, 2005 || Mount Lemmon || Mount Lemmon Survey || MAS || align=right data-sort-value="0.87" | 870 m || 
|-id=771 bgcolor=#fefefe
| 363771 ||  || — || March 10, 2005 || Mount Lemmon || Mount Lemmon Survey || NYS || align=right data-sort-value="0.63" | 630 m || 
|-id=772 bgcolor=#fefefe
| 363772 ||  || — || March 10, 2005 || Mount Lemmon || Mount Lemmon Survey || — || align=right | 1.0 km || 
|-id=773 bgcolor=#fefefe
| 363773 ||  || — || March 11, 2005 || Mount Lemmon || Mount Lemmon Survey || — || align=right | 1.00 km || 
|-id=774 bgcolor=#E9E9E9
| 363774 ||  || — || March 8, 2005 || Kitt Peak || Spacewatch || — || align=right | 2.7 km || 
|-id=775 bgcolor=#fefefe
| 363775 ||  || — || March 13, 2005 || Kitt Peak || Spacewatch || NYS || align=right data-sort-value="0.69" | 690 m || 
|-id=776 bgcolor=#fefefe
| 363776 ||  || — || March 13, 2005 || Mount Lemmon || Mount Lemmon Survey || — || align=right data-sort-value="0.78" | 780 m || 
|-id=777 bgcolor=#E9E9E9
| 363777 ||  || — || March 9, 2005 || Kitt Peak || Spacewatch || — || align=right | 2.0 km || 
|-id=778 bgcolor=#fefefe
| 363778 ||  || — || March 8, 2005 || Mount Lemmon || Mount Lemmon Survey || V || align=right data-sort-value="0.51" | 510 m || 
|-id=779 bgcolor=#E9E9E9
| 363779 ||  || — || April 4, 2005 || Catalina || CSS || — || align=right | 2.4 km || 
|-id=780 bgcolor=#fefefe
| 363780 ||  || — || April 2, 2005 || Mount Lemmon || Mount Lemmon Survey || NYS || align=right data-sort-value="0.66" | 660 m || 
|-id=781 bgcolor=#E9E9E9
| 363781 ||  || — || April 4, 2005 || Mount Lemmon || Mount Lemmon Survey || BAR || align=right | 1.4 km || 
|-id=782 bgcolor=#E9E9E9
| 363782 ||  || — || April 5, 2005 || Mount Lemmon || Mount Lemmon Survey || — || align=right | 1.3 km || 
|-id=783 bgcolor=#fefefe
| 363783 ||  || — || April 10, 2005 || Mount Lemmon || Mount Lemmon Survey || — || align=right data-sort-value="0.68" | 680 m || 
|-id=784 bgcolor=#fefefe
| 363784 ||  || — || April 10, 2005 || Kitt Peak || Spacewatch || MAS || align=right data-sort-value="0.74" | 740 m || 
|-id=785 bgcolor=#fefefe
| 363785 ||  || — || April 12, 2005 || Kitt Peak || M. W. Buie || — || align=right data-sort-value="0.62" | 620 m || 
|-id=786 bgcolor=#fefefe
| 363786 ||  || — || April 30, 2005 || Kitt Peak || Spacewatch || MAS || align=right data-sort-value="0.76" | 760 m || 
|-id=787 bgcolor=#fefefe
| 363787 ||  || — || May 6, 2005 || Socorro || LINEAR || H || align=right | 1.1 km || 
|-id=788 bgcolor=#E9E9E9
| 363788 ||  || — || May 4, 2005 || Mount Lemmon || Mount Lemmon Survey || — || align=right | 1.0 km || 
|-id=789 bgcolor=#fefefe
| 363789 ||  || — || May 3, 2005 || Catalina || CSS || H || align=right data-sort-value="0.70" | 700 m || 
|-id=790 bgcolor=#FFC2E0
| 363790 ||  || — || May 10, 2005 || Socorro || LINEAR || APO +1kmPHA || align=right data-sort-value="0.99" | 990 m || 
|-id=791 bgcolor=#E9E9E9
| 363791 ||  || — || May 8, 2005 || Mount Lemmon || Mount Lemmon Survey || — || align=right data-sort-value="0.94" | 940 m || 
|-id=792 bgcolor=#FA8072
| 363792 ||  || — || May 10, 2005 || Kitt Peak || Spacewatch || — || align=right data-sort-value="0.49" | 490 m || 
|-id=793 bgcolor=#E9E9E9
| 363793 ||  || — || May 3, 2005 || Kitt Peak || Spacewatch || — || align=right | 1.6 km || 
|-id=794 bgcolor=#E9E9E9
| 363794 ||  || — || May 14, 2005 || Kitt Peak || Spacewatch || — || align=right data-sort-value="0.88" | 880 m || 
|-id=795 bgcolor=#fefefe
| 363795 ||  || — || May 14, 2005 || Mount Lemmon || Mount Lemmon Survey || NYS || align=right data-sort-value="0.80" | 800 m || 
|-id=796 bgcolor=#E9E9E9
| 363796 ||  || — || May 13, 2005 || Kitt Peak || Spacewatch || — || align=right | 1.7 km || 
|-id=797 bgcolor=#E9E9E9
| 363797 ||  || — || May 17, 2005 || Mount Lemmon || Mount Lemmon Survey || — || align=right data-sort-value="0.94" | 940 m || 
|-id=798 bgcolor=#E9E9E9
| 363798 ||  || — || May 17, 2005 || Mount Lemmon || Mount Lemmon Survey || — || align=right | 1.0 km || 
|-id=799 bgcolor=#E9E9E9
| 363799 ||  || — || June 3, 2005 || Kitt Peak || Spacewatch || — || align=right | 2.3 km || 
|-id=800 bgcolor=#E9E9E9
| 363800 ||  || — || June 3, 2005 || Kitt Peak || Spacewatch || — || align=right | 1.4 km || 
|}

363801–363900 

|-bgcolor=#E9E9E9
| 363801 ||  || — || June 4, 2005 || Kitt Peak || Spacewatch || — || align=right data-sort-value="0.94" | 940 m || 
|-id=802 bgcolor=#FA8072
| 363802 ||  || — || June 7, 2005 || Socorro || LINEAR || — || align=right data-sort-value="0.98" | 980 m || 
|-id=803 bgcolor=#E9E9E9
| 363803 ||  || — || June 4, 2005 || Kitt Peak || Spacewatch || — || align=right | 1.00 km || 
|-id=804 bgcolor=#E9E9E9
| 363804 ||  || — || June 4, 2005 || Kitt Peak || Spacewatch || — || align=right | 1.0 km || 
|-id=805 bgcolor=#E9E9E9
| 363805 ||  || — || June 6, 2005 || Kitt Peak || Spacewatch || — || align=right | 1.2 km || 
|-id=806 bgcolor=#E9E9E9
| 363806 ||  || — || June 8, 2005 || Kitt Peak || Spacewatch || — || align=right | 1.1 km || 
|-id=807 bgcolor=#E9E9E9
| 363807 ||  || — || June 8, 2005 || Kitt Peak || Spacewatch || — || align=right | 1.1 km || 
|-id=808 bgcolor=#E9E9E9
| 363808 ||  || — || June 5, 2005 || Kitt Peak || Spacewatch || — || align=right | 1.3 km || 
|-id=809 bgcolor=#E9E9E9
| 363809 ||  || — || June 27, 2005 || Kitt Peak || Spacewatch || — || align=right | 1.7 km || 
|-id=810 bgcolor=#E9E9E9
| 363810 ||  || — || June 29, 2005 || Kitt Peak || Spacewatch || — || align=right | 2.0 km || 
|-id=811 bgcolor=#E9E9E9
| 363811 ||  || — || June 29, 2005 || Kitt Peak || Spacewatch || — || align=right | 1.6 km || 
|-id=812 bgcolor=#E9E9E9
| 363812 ||  || — || June 29, 2005 || Palomar || NEAT || RAF || align=right | 1.0 km || 
|-id=813 bgcolor=#E9E9E9
| 363813 ||  || — || July 1, 2005 || Palomar || NEAT || — || align=right | 2.0 km || 
|-id=814 bgcolor=#FFC2E0
| 363814 ||  || — || July 5, 2005 || Haleakala || NEAT || APO +1km || align=right | 1.1 km || 
|-id=815 bgcolor=#E9E9E9
| 363815 ||  || — || July 5, 2005 || Palomar || NEAT || HNS || align=right | 1.5 km || 
|-id=816 bgcolor=#E9E9E9
| 363816 ||  || — || July 8, 2005 || Kitt Peak || Spacewatch || — || align=right | 1.3 km || 
|-id=817 bgcolor=#E9E9E9
| 363817 ||  || — || July 8, 2005 || Catalina || CSS || JUN || align=right | 1.7 km || 
|-id=818 bgcolor=#E9E9E9
| 363818 ||  || — || July 5, 2005 || Palomar || NEAT || — || align=right | 1.5 km || 
|-id=819 bgcolor=#d6d6d6
| 363819 ||  || — || September 24, 2000 || Anderson Mesa || LONEOS || EOS || align=right | 2.4 km || 
|-id=820 bgcolor=#E9E9E9
| 363820 ||  || — || July 5, 2005 || Palomar || NEAT || — || align=right | 2.0 km || 
|-id=821 bgcolor=#E9E9E9
| 363821 ||  || — || June 29, 2005 || Kitt Peak || Spacewatch || — || align=right data-sort-value="0.98" | 980 m || 
|-id=822 bgcolor=#E9E9E9
| 363822 ||  || — || July 3, 2005 || Mount Lemmon || Mount Lemmon Survey || — || align=right | 1.7 km || 
|-id=823 bgcolor=#E9E9E9
| 363823 ||  || — || July 1, 2005 || Kitt Peak || Spacewatch || — || align=right | 1.5 km || 
|-id=824 bgcolor=#E9E9E9
| 363824 ||  || — || July 6, 2005 || Kitt Peak || Spacewatch || — || align=right | 1.8 km || 
|-id=825 bgcolor=#E9E9E9
| 363825 ||  || — || July 10, 2005 || Catalina || CSS || — || align=right | 2.1 km || 
|-id=826 bgcolor=#E9E9E9
| 363826 ||  || — || July 29, 2005 || Palomar || NEAT || — || align=right | 2.0 km || 
|-id=827 bgcolor=#fefefe
| 363827 ||  || — || July 28, 2005 || Palomar || NEAT || — || align=right data-sort-value="0.75" | 750 m || 
|-id=828 bgcolor=#E9E9E9
| 363828 ||  || — || July 28, 2005 || Palomar || NEAT || — || align=right | 1.7 km || 
|-id=829 bgcolor=#FA8072
| 363829 ||  || — || August 10, 2005 || Siding Spring || SSS || — || align=right | 1.7 km || 
|-id=830 bgcolor=#E9E9E9
| 363830 ||  || — || August 4, 2005 || Palomar || NEAT || — || align=right | 2.5 km || 
|-id=831 bgcolor=#FFC2E0
| 363831 ||  || — || August 1, 2005 || Mauna Kea || D. J. Tholen || APOPHA || align=right data-sort-value="0.37" | 370 m || 
|-id=832 bgcolor=#E9E9E9
| 363832 ||  || — || August 6, 2005 || Palomar || NEAT || MIS || align=right | 3.0 km || 
|-id=833 bgcolor=#E9E9E9
| 363833 ||  || — || August 8, 2005 || Siding Spring || SSS || — || align=right | 2.0 km || 
|-id=834 bgcolor=#E9E9E9
| 363834 ||  || — || August 5, 2005 || Mauna Kea || P. A. Wiegert || — || align=right | 1.5 km || 
|-id=835 bgcolor=#E9E9E9
| 363835 ||  || — || August 22, 2005 || Palomar || NEAT || EUN || align=right | 1.5 km || 
|-id=836 bgcolor=#E9E9E9
| 363836 ||  || — || August 24, 2005 || Palomar || NEAT || MIS || align=right | 2.7 km || 
|-id=837 bgcolor=#E9E9E9
| 363837 ||  || — || August 25, 2005 || Campo Imperatore || CINEOS || JUN || align=right | 1.3 km || 
|-id=838 bgcolor=#E9E9E9
| 363838 ||  || — || August 25, 2005 || Palomar || NEAT || — || align=right data-sort-value="0.91" | 910 m || 
|-id=839 bgcolor=#E9E9E9
| 363839 ||  || — || August 25, 2005 || Palomar || NEAT || — || align=right | 3.1 km || 
|-id=840 bgcolor=#E9E9E9
| 363840 ||  || — || July 30, 2005 || Palomar || NEAT || — || align=right | 2.5 km || 
|-id=841 bgcolor=#E9E9E9
| 363841 ||  || — || August 26, 2005 || Anderson Mesa || LONEOS || — || align=right | 1.6 km || 
|-id=842 bgcolor=#E9E9E9
| 363842 ||  || — || August 25, 2005 || Campo Imperatore || CINEOS || — || align=right | 1.4 km || 
|-id=843 bgcolor=#E9E9E9
| 363843 ||  || — || August 28, 2005 || Kitt Peak || Spacewatch || — || align=right | 2.1 km || 
|-id=844 bgcolor=#E9E9E9
| 363844 ||  || — || August 26, 2005 || Palomar || NEAT || — || align=right | 1.6 km || 
|-id=845 bgcolor=#E9E9E9
| 363845 ||  || — || August 27, 2005 || Haleakala || NEAT || JUN || align=right | 1.4 km || 
|-id=846 bgcolor=#E9E9E9
| 363846 ||  || — || August 28, 2005 || Siding Spring || SSS || EUN || align=right | 1.6 km || 
|-id=847 bgcolor=#d6d6d6
| 363847 ||  || — || August 29, 2005 || Kitt Peak || Spacewatch || — || align=right | 3.9 km || 
|-id=848 bgcolor=#E9E9E9
| 363848 ||  || — || August 29, 2005 || Bergisch Gladbac || W. Bickel || EUN || align=right | 1.7 km || 
|-id=849 bgcolor=#E9E9E9
| 363849 ||  || — || August 26, 2005 || Palomar || NEAT || GEF || align=right | 1.2 km || 
|-id=850 bgcolor=#E9E9E9
| 363850 ||  || — || August 27, 2005 || Palomar || NEAT || ADE || align=right | 2.2 km || 
|-id=851 bgcolor=#E9E9E9
| 363851 ||  || — || August 28, 2005 || Kitt Peak || Spacewatch || HOF || align=right | 2.6 km || 
|-id=852 bgcolor=#E9E9E9
| 363852 ||  || — || August 28, 2005 || Kitt Peak || Spacewatch || — || align=right | 2.1 km || 
|-id=853 bgcolor=#E9E9E9
| 363853 ||  || — || August 28, 2005 || Kitt Peak || Spacewatch || AGN || align=right | 1.3 km || 
|-id=854 bgcolor=#E9E9E9
| 363854 ||  || — || August 29, 2005 || Kitt Peak || Spacewatch || — || align=right | 2.5 km || 
|-id=855 bgcolor=#E9E9E9
| 363855 ||  || — || August 30, 2005 || Anderson Mesa || LONEOS || — || align=right | 2.0 km || 
|-id=856 bgcolor=#E9E9E9
| 363856 ||  || — || August 28, 2005 || Anderson Mesa || LONEOS || — || align=right | 1.3 km || 
|-id=857 bgcolor=#E9E9E9
| 363857 ||  || — || August 26, 2005 || Palomar || NEAT || — || align=right | 1.8 km || 
|-id=858 bgcolor=#E9E9E9
| 363858 ||  || — || September 5, 2005 || Catalina || CSS || — || align=right | 1.9 km || 
|-id=859 bgcolor=#E9E9E9
| 363859 ||  || — || September 1, 2005 || Kitt Peak || Spacewatch || — || align=right | 1.8 km || 
|-id=860 bgcolor=#E9E9E9
| 363860 ||  || — || September 1, 2005 || Kitt Peak || Spacewatch || — || align=right | 2.0 km || 
|-id=861 bgcolor=#E9E9E9
| 363861 ||  || — || September 1, 2005 || Kitt Peak || Spacewatch || EUN || align=right | 1.3 km || 
|-id=862 bgcolor=#E9E9E9
| 363862 ||  || — || September 9, 2005 || Socorro || LINEAR || — || align=right | 2.0 km || 
|-id=863 bgcolor=#E9E9E9
| 363863 ||  || — || September 10, 2005 || Anderson Mesa || LONEOS || — || align=right | 2.4 km || 
|-id=864 bgcolor=#FA8072
| 363864 ||  || — || September 11, 2005 || Socorro || LINEAR || — || align=right | 1.9 km || 
|-id=865 bgcolor=#E9E9E9
| 363865 ||  || — || September 13, 2005 || Catalina || CSS || — || align=right | 2.6 km || 
|-id=866 bgcolor=#E9E9E9
| 363866 ||  || — || September 14, 2005 || Apache Point || A. C. Becker || — || align=right | 2.3 km || 
|-id=867 bgcolor=#d6d6d6
| 363867 ||  || — || September 12, 2005 || Kitt Peak || Spacewatch || — || align=right | 2.9 km || 
|-id=868 bgcolor=#d6d6d6
| 363868 ||  || — || September 1, 2005 || Palomar || NEAT || — || align=right | 4.9 km || 
|-id=869 bgcolor=#d6d6d6
| 363869 ||  || — || September 26, 2005 || Kitt Peak || Spacewatch || VER || align=right | 3.4 km || 
|-id=870 bgcolor=#E9E9E9
| 363870 ||  || — || September 25, 2005 || Palomar || NEAT || — || align=right | 2.2 km || 
|-id=871 bgcolor=#E9E9E9
| 363871 ||  || — || September 23, 2005 || Kitt Peak || Spacewatch || MRX || align=right | 1.3 km || 
|-id=872 bgcolor=#E9E9E9
| 363872 ||  || — || September 23, 2005 || Kitt Peak || Spacewatch || — || align=right | 2.7 km || 
|-id=873 bgcolor=#E9E9E9
| 363873 ||  || — || September 24, 2005 || Kitt Peak || Spacewatch || — || align=right | 1.8 km || 
|-id=874 bgcolor=#E9E9E9
| 363874 ||  || — || September 24, 2005 || Kitt Peak || Spacewatch || — || align=right | 2.2 km || 
|-id=875 bgcolor=#E9E9E9
| 363875 ||  || — || September 24, 2005 || Kitt Peak || Spacewatch || NEM || align=right | 2.3 km || 
|-id=876 bgcolor=#E9E9E9
| 363876 ||  || — || September 24, 2005 || Kitt Peak || Spacewatch || — || align=right | 1.7 km || 
|-id=877 bgcolor=#E9E9E9
| 363877 ||  || — || September 24, 2005 || Kitt Peak || Spacewatch || — || align=right | 2.5 km || 
|-id=878 bgcolor=#E9E9E9
| 363878 ||  || — || September 26, 2005 || Kitt Peak || Spacewatch || AEO || align=right | 1.2 km || 
|-id=879 bgcolor=#E9E9E9
| 363879 ||  || — || September 26, 2005 || Kitt Peak || Spacewatch || — || align=right | 2.8 km || 
|-id=880 bgcolor=#E9E9E9
| 363880 ||  || — || September 26, 2005 || Kitt Peak || Spacewatch || — || align=right | 2.7 km || 
|-id=881 bgcolor=#E9E9E9
| 363881 ||  || — || September 26, 2005 || Palomar || NEAT || — || align=right | 1.7 km || 
|-id=882 bgcolor=#fefefe
| 363882 ||  || — || September 26, 2005 || Palomar || NEAT || — || align=right data-sort-value="0.76" | 760 m || 
|-id=883 bgcolor=#E9E9E9
| 363883 ||  || — || September 26, 2005 || Palomar || NEAT || GEF || align=right | 1.4 km || 
|-id=884 bgcolor=#E9E9E9
| 363884 ||  || — || September 24, 2005 || Kitt Peak || Spacewatch || — || align=right | 2.0 km || 
|-id=885 bgcolor=#E9E9E9
| 363885 ||  || — || September 24, 2005 || Kitt Peak || Spacewatch || JUN || align=right data-sort-value="0.97" | 970 m || 
|-id=886 bgcolor=#E9E9E9
| 363886 ||  || — || September 24, 2005 || Kitt Peak || Spacewatch || MRX || align=right | 1.1 km || 
|-id=887 bgcolor=#E9E9E9
| 363887 ||  || — || September 24, 2005 || Kitt Peak || Spacewatch || GEF || align=right | 1.4 km || 
|-id=888 bgcolor=#E9E9E9
| 363888 ||  || — || September 25, 2005 || Kitt Peak || Spacewatch || MRX || align=right | 1.0 km || 
|-id=889 bgcolor=#E9E9E9
| 363889 ||  || — || September 25, 2005 || Palomar || NEAT || JUN || align=right data-sort-value="0.94" | 940 m || 
|-id=890 bgcolor=#E9E9E9
| 363890 ||  || — || September 26, 2005 || Palomar || NEAT || — || align=right | 2.1 km || 
|-id=891 bgcolor=#E9E9E9
| 363891 ||  || — || September 1, 2005 || Anderson Mesa || LONEOS || INO || align=right | 1.4 km || 
|-id=892 bgcolor=#E9E9E9
| 363892 ||  || — || September 26, 2005 || Kitt Peak || Spacewatch || EUN || align=right | 1.1 km || 
|-id=893 bgcolor=#d6d6d6
| 363893 ||  || — || September 26, 2005 || Kitt Peak || Spacewatch || — || align=right | 2.2 km || 
|-id=894 bgcolor=#E9E9E9
| 363894 ||  || — || September 28, 2005 || Palomar || NEAT || — || align=right | 2.1 km || 
|-id=895 bgcolor=#E9E9E9
| 363895 ||  || — || September 25, 2005 || Kitt Peak || Spacewatch || HOF || align=right | 2.5 km || 
|-id=896 bgcolor=#d6d6d6
| 363896 ||  || — || September 25, 2005 || Kitt Peak || Spacewatch || — || align=right | 2.5 km || 
|-id=897 bgcolor=#d6d6d6
| 363897 ||  || — || September 25, 2005 || Kitt Peak || Spacewatch || K-2 || align=right | 1.3 km || 
|-id=898 bgcolor=#E9E9E9
| 363898 ||  || — || September 25, 2005 || Kitt Peak || Spacewatch || AGN || align=right | 1.2 km || 
|-id=899 bgcolor=#E9E9E9
| 363899 ||  || — || September 26, 2005 || Palomar || NEAT || JUN || align=right | 1.3 km || 
|-id=900 bgcolor=#E9E9E9
| 363900 ||  || — || September 28, 2005 || Palomar || NEAT || — || align=right | 1.8 km || 
|}

363901–364000 

|-bgcolor=#d6d6d6
| 363901 ||  || — || September 29, 2005 || Kitt Peak || Spacewatch || — || align=right | 2.2 km || 
|-id=902 bgcolor=#E9E9E9
| 363902 ||  || — || September 29, 2005 || Kitt Peak || Spacewatch || — || align=right | 2.3 km || 
|-id=903 bgcolor=#E9E9E9
| 363903 ||  || — || September 29, 2005 || Anderson Mesa || LONEOS || GEF || align=right | 1.2 km || 
|-id=904 bgcolor=#E9E9E9
| 363904 ||  || — || September 29, 2005 || Kitt Peak || Spacewatch || AGN || align=right | 1.3 km || 
|-id=905 bgcolor=#d6d6d6
| 363905 ||  || — || September 29, 2005 || Mount Lemmon || Mount Lemmon Survey || KAR || align=right | 1.1 km || 
|-id=906 bgcolor=#E9E9E9
| 363906 ||  || — || September 29, 2005 || Kitt Peak || Spacewatch || — || align=right | 1.1 km || 
|-id=907 bgcolor=#E9E9E9
| 363907 ||  || — || September 29, 2005 || Mount Lemmon || Mount Lemmon Survey || — || align=right | 1.8 km || 
|-id=908 bgcolor=#E9E9E9
| 363908 ||  || — || September 30, 2005 || Mount Lemmon || Mount Lemmon Survey || — || align=right | 1.9 km || 
|-id=909 bgcolor=#d6d6d6
| 363909 ||  || — || September 30, 2005 || Kitt Peak || Spacewatch || — || align=right | 3.8 km || 
|-id=910 bgcolor=#E9E9E9
| 363910 ||  || — || September 30, 2005 || Palomar || NEAT || — || align=right | 3.1 km || 
|-id=911 bgcolor=#E9E9E9
| 363911 ||  || — || September 25, 2005 || Catalina || CSS || — || align=right | 3.6 km || 
|-id=912 bgcolor=#E9E9E9
| 363912 ||  || — || September 30, 2005 || Palomar || NEAT || MRX || align=right | 1.3 km || 
|-id=913 bgcolor=#d6d6d6
| 363913 ||  || — || September 30, 2005 || Mount Lemmon || Mount Lemmon Survey || — || align=right | 3.8 km || 
|-id=914 bgcolor=#E9E9E9
| 363914 ||  || — || September 29, 2005 || Mount Lemmon || Mount Lemmon Survey || — || align=right | 1.8 km || 
|-id=915 bgcolor=#d6d6d6
| 363915 ||  || — || September 29, 2005 || Kitt Peak || Spacewatch || critical || align=right | 2.2 km || 
|-id=916 bgcolor=#E9E9E9
| 363916 ||  || — || September 30, 2005 || Socorro || LINEAR || — || align=right | 2.8 km || 
|-id=917 bgcolor=#d6d6d6
| 363917 ||  || — || September 30, 2005 || Mount Lemmon || Mount Lemmon Survey || — || align=right | 2.8 km || 
|-id=918 bgcolor=#E9E9E9
| 363918 ||  || — || September 30, 2005 || Mount Lemmon || Mount Lemmon Survey || XIZ || align=right | 1.5 km || 
|-id=919 bgcolor=#E9E9E9
| 363919 ||  || — || September 29, 2005 || Kitt Peak || Spacewatch || — || align=right | 2.4 km || 
|-id=920 bgcolor=#E9E9E9
| 363920 ||  || — || September 30, 2005 || Mount Lemmon || Mount Lemmon Survey || — || align=right | 2.4 km || 
|-id=921 bgcolor=#E9E9E9
| 363921 ||  || — || September 22, 2005 || Palomar || NEAT || — || align=right | 2.0 km || 
|-id=922 bgcolor=#d6d6d6
| 363922 ||  || — || September 29, 2005 || Kitt Peak || Spacewatch || — || align=right | 2.7 km || 
|-id=923 bgcolor=#E9E9E9
| 363923 ||  || — || September 24, 2005 || Palomar || NEAT || MRX || align=right | 1.3 km || 
|-id=924 bgcolor=#E9E9E9
| 363924 ||  || — || September 28, 2005 || Palomar || NEAT || — || align=right | 2.3 km || 
|-id=925 bgcolor=#d6d6d6
| 363925 ||  || — || September 29, 2005 || Kitt Peak || Spacewatch || EOS || align=right | 1.9 km || 
|-id=926 bgcolor=#d6d6d6
| 363926 ||  || — || September 26, 2005 || Apache Point || A. C. Becker || — || align=right | 2.7 km || 
|-id=927 bgcolor=#d6d6d6
| 363927 ||  || — || September 26, 2005 || Apache Point || A. C. Becker || — || align=right | 3.0 km || 
|-id=928 bgcolor=#d6d6d6
| 363928 ||  || — || October 1, 2005 || Mount Lemmon || Mount Lemmon Survey || — || align=right | 1.8 km || 
|-id=929 bgcolor=#E9E9E9
| 363929 ||  || — || October 1, 2005 || Catalina || CSS || — || align=right | 2.0 km || 
|-id=930 bgcolor=#E9E9E9
| 363930 ||  || — || October 1, 2005 || Kitt Peak || Spacewatch || — || align=right | 2.2 km || 
|-id=931 bgcolor=#E9E9E9
| 363931 ||  || — || October 6, 2005 || Mount Lemmon || Mount Lemmon Survey || NEM || align=right | 2.8 km || 
|-id=932 bgcolor=#E9E9E9
| 363932 ||  || — || October 1, 2005 || Socorro || LINEAR || — || align=right | 3.1 km || 
|-id=933 bgcolor=#d6d6d6
| 363933 ||  || — || October 1, 2005 || Mount Lemmon || Mount Lemmon Survey || — || align=right | 3.8 km || 
|-id=934 bgcolor=#d6d6d6
| 363934 ||  || — || October 6, 2005 || Mount Lemmon || Mount Lemmon Survey || CHA || align=right | 1.4 km || 
|-id=935 bgcolor=#E9E9E9
| 363935 ||  || — || October 3, 2005 || Kitt Peak || Spacewatch || WIT || align=right | 1.0 km || 
|-id=936 bgcolor=#E9E9E9
| 363936 ||  || — || October 3, 2005 || Socorro || LINEAR || — || align=right | 3.4 km || 
|-id=937 bgcolor=#E9E9E9
| 363937 ||  || — || October 5, 2005 || Kitt Peak || Spacewatch || HOF || align=right | 2.3 km || 
|-id=938 bgcolor=#E9E9E9
| 363938 ||  || — || October 6, 2005 || Mount Lemmon || Mount Lemmon Survey || — || align=right | 2.4 km || 
|-id=939 bgcolor=#E9E9E9
| 363939 ||  || — || October 9, 2005 || Kitt Peak || Spacewatch || DOR || align=right | 2.4 km || 
|-id=940 bgcolor=#E9E9E9
| 363940 ||  || — || October 7, 2005 || Kitt Peak || Spacewatch || HOF || align=right | 2.5 km || 
|-id=941 bgcolor=#E9E9E9
| 363941 ||  || — || September 27, 2005 || Kitt Peak || Spacewatch || — || align=right | 2.0 km || 
|-id=942 bgcolor=#E9E9E9
| 363942 ||  || — || October 7, 2005 || Kitt Peak || Spacewatch || — || align=right | 2.5 km || 
|-id=943 bgcolor=#E9E9E9
| 363943 ||  || — || October 7, 2005 || Kitt Peak || Spacewatch || AGN || align=right | 1.1 km || 
|-id=944 bgcolor=#d6d6d6
| 363944 ||  || — || October 7, 2005 || Kitt Peak || Spacewatch || KOR || align=right | 1.2 km || 
|-id=945 bgcolor=#E9E9E9
| 363945 ||  || — || September 29, 2005 || Kitt Peak || Spacewatch || — || align=right | 1.9 km || 
|-id=946 bgcolor=#E9E9E9
| 363946 ||  || — || September 29, 2005 || Kitt Peak || Spacewatch || MRX || align=right | 1.1 km || 
|-id=947 bgcolor=#E9E9E9
| 363947 ||  || — || October 9, 2005 || Kitt Peak || Spacewatch || MRX || align=right | 1.2 km || 
|-id=948 bgcolor=#E9E9E9
| 363948 ||  || — || October 13, 2005 || Socorro || LINEAR || DOR || align=right | 3.6 km || 
|-id=949 bgcolor=#d6d6d6
| 363949 ||  || — || October 5, 2005 || Kitt Peak || Spacewatch || — || align=right | 3.4 km || 
|-id=950 bgcolor=#E9E9E9
| 363950 ||  || — || October 8, 2005 || Catalina || CSS || JUN || align=right | 1.2 km || 
|-id=951 bgcolor=#d6d6d6
| 363951 ||  || — || October 13, 2005 || Socorro || LINEAR || BRA || align=right | 2.0 km || 
|-id=952 bgcolor=#d6d6d6
| 363952 ||  || — || October 27, 2005 || Ottmarsheim || C. Rinner || — || align=right | 3.6 km || 
|-id=953 bgcolor=#E9E9E9
| 363953 ||  || — || October 23, 2005 || Kitt Peak || Spacewatch || — || align=right | 2.4 km || 
|-id=954 bgcolor=#E9E9E9
| 363954 ||  || — || October 23, 2005 || Kitt Peak || Spacewatch || — || align=right | 2.5 km || 
|-id=955 bgcolor=#E9E9E9
| 363955 ||  || — || October 23, 2005 || Kitt Peak || Spacewatch || — || align=right | 2.3 km || 
|-id=956 bgcolor=#E9E9E9
| 363956 ||  || — || October 23, 2005 || Kitt Peak || Spacewatch || — || align=right | 1.4 km || 
|-id=957 bgcolor=#d6d6d6
| 363957 ||  || — || October 24, 2005 || Kitt Peak || Spacewatch || — || align=right | 2.5 km || 
|-id=958 bgcolor=#d6d6d6
| 363958 ||  || — || October 22, 2005 || Kitt Peak || Spacewatch || — || align=right | 2.7 km || 
|-id=959 bgcolor=#d6d6d6
| 363959 ||  || — || September 26, 2005 || Kitt Peak || Spacewatch || EOS || align=right | 2.4 km || 
|-id=960 bgcolor=#E9E9E9
| 363960 ||  || — || October 24, 2005 || Kitt Peak || Spacewatch || — || align=right | 2.1 km || 
|-id=961 bgcolor=#E9E9E9
| 363961 ||  || — || September 29, 2005 || Mount Lemmon || Mount Lemmon Survey || GEF || align=right | 1.1 km || 
|-id=962 bgcolor=#d6d6d6
| 363962 ||  || — || October 22, 2005 || Kitt Peak || Spacewatch || — || align=right | 2.6 km || 
|-id=963 bgcolor=#d6d6d6
| 363963 ||  || — || October 22, 2005 || Kitt Peak || Spacewatch || — || align=right | 3.5 km || 
|-id=964 bgcolor=#d6d6d6
| 363964 ||  || — || October 22, 2005 || Kitt Peak || Spacewatch || — || align=right | 3.2 km || 
|-id=965 bgcolor=#E9E9E9
| 363965 ||  || — || October 22, 2005 || Kitt Peak || Spacewatch || MRX || align=right | 1.2 km || 
|-id=966 bgcolor=#E9E9E9
| 363966 ||  || — || October 24, 2005 || Kitt Peak || Spacewatch || MRX || align=right | 1.3 km || 
|-id=967 bgcolor=#d6d6d6
| 363967 ||  || — || October 24, 2005 || Anderson Mesa || LONEOS || — || align=right | 3.2 km || 
|-id=968 bgcolor=#d6d6d6
| 363968 ||  || — || October 24, 2005 || Kitt Peak || Spacewatch || JLI || align=right | 3.5 km || 
|-id=969 bgcolor=#E9E9E9
| 363969 ||  || — || October 24, 2005 || Kitt Peak || Spacewatch || — || align=right | 1.9 km || 
|-id=970 bgcolor=#d6d6d6
| 363970 ||  || — || October 24, 2005 || Kitt Peak || Spacewatch || — || align=right | 3.5 km || 
|-id=971 bgcolor=#E9E9E9
| 363971 ||  || — || October 24, 2005 || Palomar || NEAT || — || align=right | 1.5 km || 
|-id=972 bgcolor=#E9E9E9
| 363972 ||  || — || October 25, 2005 || Catalina || CSS || — || align=right | 2.5 km || 
|-id=973 bgcolor=#d6d6d6
| 363973 ||  || — || October 26, 2005 || Kitt Peak || Spacewatch || — || align=right | 2.3 km || 
|-id=974 bgcolor=#d6d6d6
| 363974 ||  || — || October 26, 2005 || Kitt Peak || Spacewatch || LIX || align=right | 3.6 km || 
|-id=975 bgcolor=#d6d6d6
| 363975 ||  || — || October 26, 2005 || Kitt Peak || Spacewatch || EUP || align=right | 3.8 km || 
|-id=976 bgcolor=#d6d6d6
| 363976 ||  || — || October 29, 2005 || Goodricke-Pigott || R. A. Tucker || — || align=right | 3.6 km || 
|-id=977 bgcolor=#fefefe
| 363977 ||  || — || October 24, 2005 || Kitt Peak || Spacewatch || — || align=right data-sort-value="0.57" | 570 m || 
|-id=978 bgcolor=#E9E9E9
| 363978 ||  || — || October 24, 2005 || Kitt Peak || Spacewatch || — || align=right data-sort-value="0.86" | 860 m || 
|-id=979 bgcolor=#d6d6d6
| 363979 ||  || — || October 25, 2005 || Mount Lemmon || Mount Lemmon Survey || — || align=right | 2.9 km || 
|-id=980 bgcolor=#d6d6d6
| 363980 ||  || — || October 25, 2005 || Kitt Peak || Spacewatch || — || align=right | 3.0 km || 
|-id=981 bgcolor=#d6d6d6
| 363981 ||  || — || October 25, 2005 || Kitt Peak || Spacewatch || THM || align=right | 1.9 km || 
|-id=982 bgcolor=#d6d6d6
| 363982 ||  || — || October 27, 2005 || Kitt Peak || Spacewatch || KOR || align=right | 1.4 km || 
|-id=983 bgcolor=#d6d6d6
| 363983 ||  || — || October 27, 2005 || Mount Lemmon || Mount Lemmon Survey || — || align=right | 3.0 km || 
|-id=984 bgcolor=#E9E9E9
| 363984 ||  || — || October 25, 2005 || Catalina || CSS || — || align=right | 3.4 km || 
|-id=985 bgcolor=#d6d6d6
| 363985 ||  || — || October 25, 2005 || Kitt Peak || Spacewatch || — || align=right | 2.6 km || 
|-id=986 bgcolor=#E9E9E9
| 363986 ||  || — || October 25, 2005 || Mount Lemmon || Mount Lemmon Survey || AEO || align=right | 1.2 km || 
|-id=987 bgcolor=#d6d6d6
| 363987 ||  || — || October 26, 2005 || Kitt Peak || Spacewatch || — || align=right | 2.7 km || 
|-id=988 bgcolor=#d6d6d6
| 363988 ||  || — || October 27, 2005 || Kitt Peak || Spacewatch || — || align=right | 2.5 km || 
|-id=989 bgcolor=#E9E9E9
| 363989 ||  || — || October 24, 2005 || Kitt Peak || Spacewatch || — || align=right | 2.0 km || 
|-id=990 bgcolor=#E9E9E9
| 363990 ||  || — || October 24, 2005 || Kitt Peak || Spacewatch || — || align=right | 2.7 km || 
|-id=991 bgcolor=#d6d6d6
| 363991 ||  || — || October 26, 2005 || Kitt Peak || Spacewatch || EOS || align=right | 1.7 km || 
|-id=992 bgcolor=#d6d6d6
| 363992 ||  || — || October 27, 2005 || Mount Lemmon || Mount Lemmon Survey || — || align=right | 2.8 km || 
|-id=993 bgcolor=#E9E9E9
| 363993 ||  || — || October 27, 2005 || Socorro || LINEAR || — || align=right | 3.5 km || 
|-id=994 bgcolor=#d6d6d6
| 363994 ||  || — || October 25, 2005 || Kitt Peak || Spacewatch || — || align=right | 2.7 km || 
|-id=995 bgcolor=#d6d6d6
| 363995 ||  || — || October 25, 2005 || Kitt Peak || Spacewatch || KAR || align=right | 1.0 km || 
|-id=996 bgcolor=#d6d6d6
| 363996 ||  || — || October 28, 2005 || Mount Lemmon || Mount Lemmon Survey || HYG || align=right | 1.9 km || 
|-id=997 bgcolor=#d6d6d6
| 363997 ||  || — || October 30, 2005 || Kitt Peak || Spacewatch || — || align=right | 1.9 km || 
|-id=998 bgcolor=#d6d6d6
| 363998 ||  || — || October 27, 2005 || Kitt Peak || Spacewatch || — || align=right | 2.5 km || 
|-id=999 bgcolor=#d6d6d6
| 363999 ||  || — || October 27, 2005 || Kitt Peak || Spacewatch || KOR || align=right | 1.2 km || 
|-id=000 bgcolor=#E9E9E9
| 364000 ||  || — || October 26, 2005 || Socorro || LINEAR || — || align=right | 2.1 km || 
|}

References

External links 
 Discovery Circumstances: Numbered Minor Planets (360001)–(365000) (IAU Minor Planet Center)

0363